= Yokohama photographs =

Yokohama photographs also known as Herbert Geddes collection or Life in Japan, ca. 1910 is a collection of photographic glass-plate transparencies collected by Canadian Herbert Geddes in the beginning of the 20th century. The collection is stored in the University of Victoria.

== Herbert Geddes ==
Herbert Geddes (1877–1970) worked for G.R. Gregg and Company in Vancouver and Winnipeg. He was sent by the company to Japan, and lived in Yokohama for ten years, from 1908 to 1918. He worked as a manager for the company to mid-1950s.

== Collection ==
Glass-plates depicting life in Japan were sold to foreigners between 1868 and 1912. Plates in Geddes' collection include "scenery, street scenes, workers, farming, fishing, silk production, stone carvers, wood carvers, metal workers, potters, and artists". Glass-plates were colored by hand. As noted by Clémence Leleu for PEN online, "This was a very popular practice, which, in the specific case of glass-plate photographs, made it possible to add density and variable contours to the subject through the use of transparency and variations in brightness."

== Gallery ==
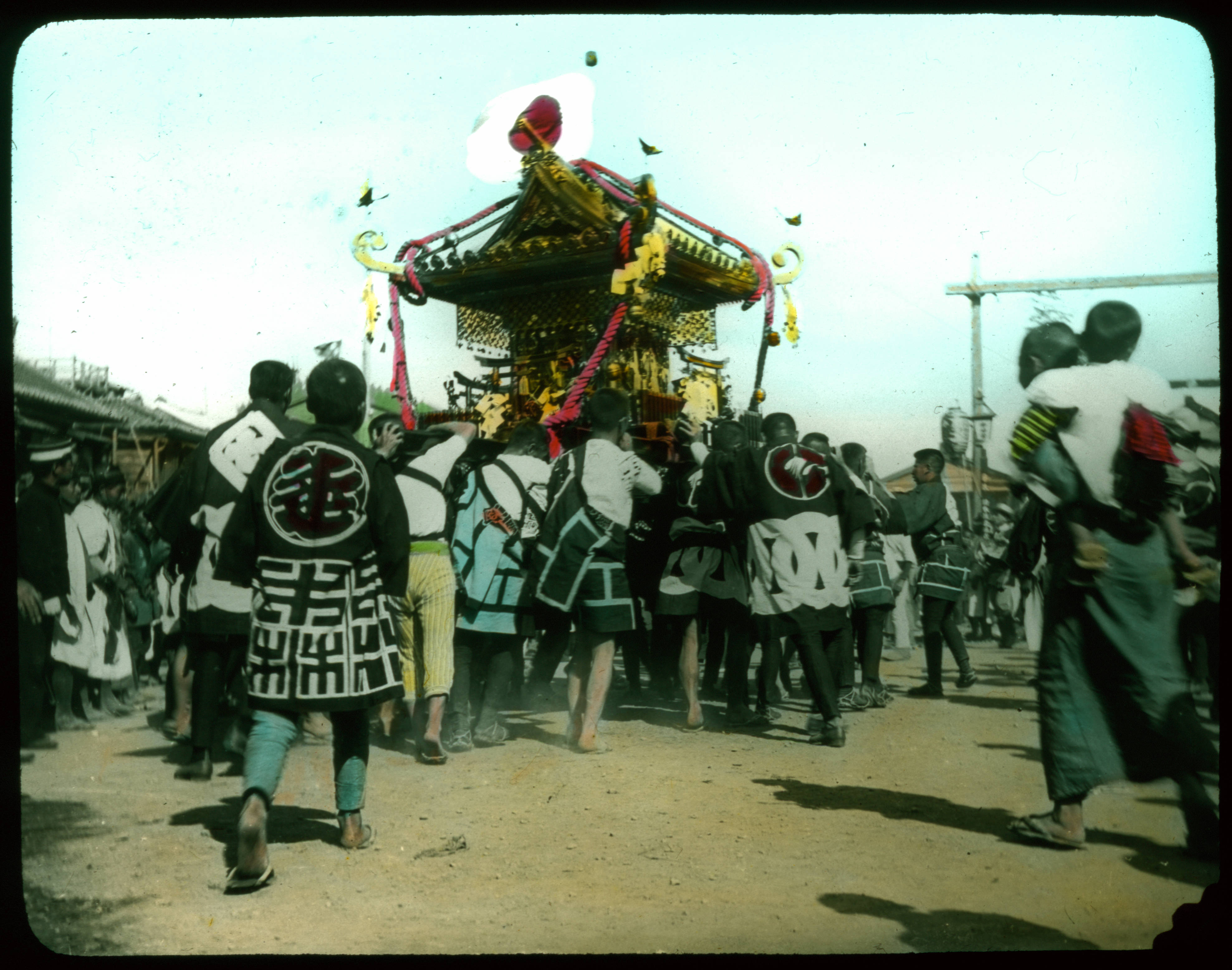
(Dashi) parade

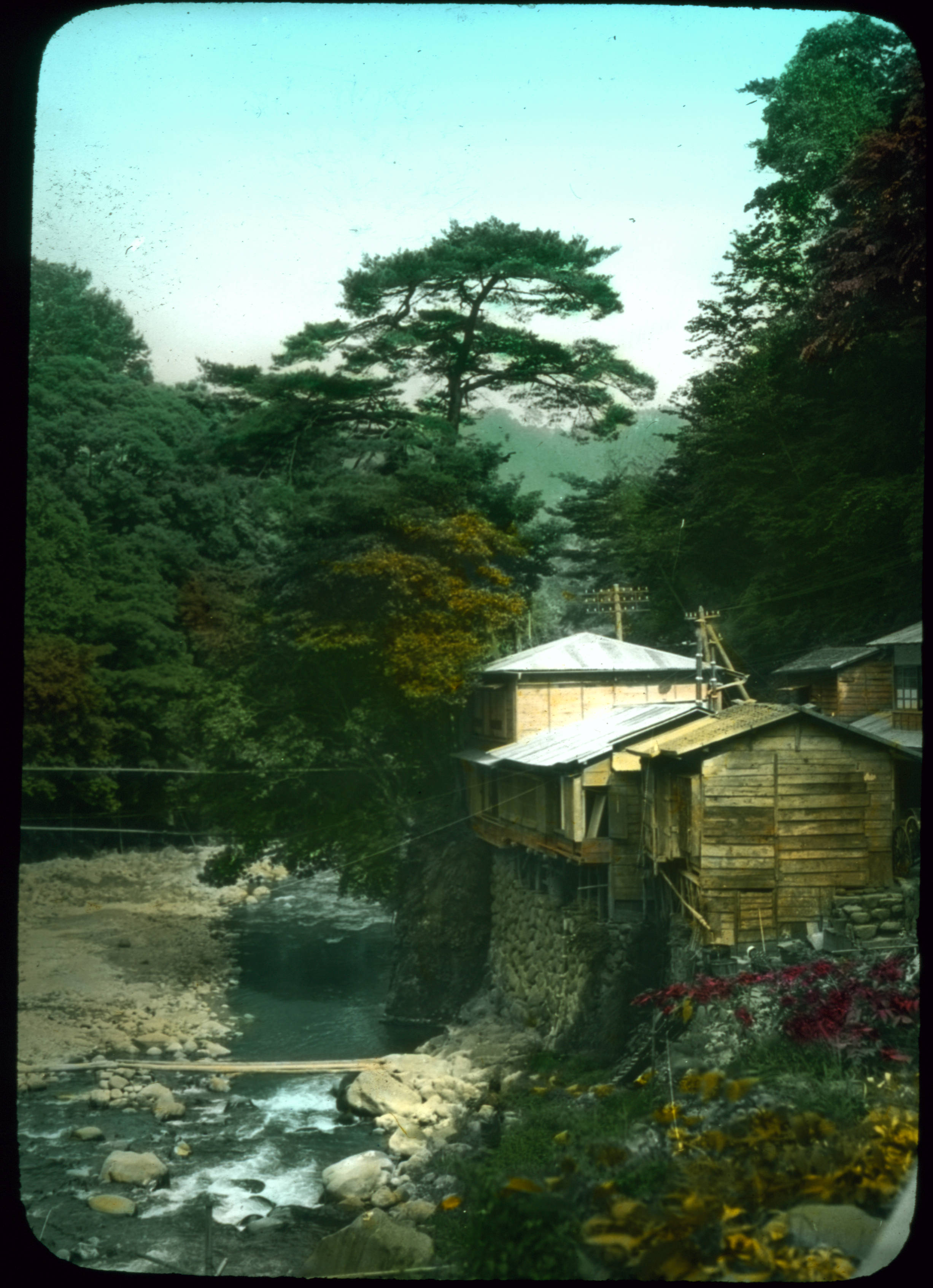
Buildings built up on stone walled riverbank with trees in background

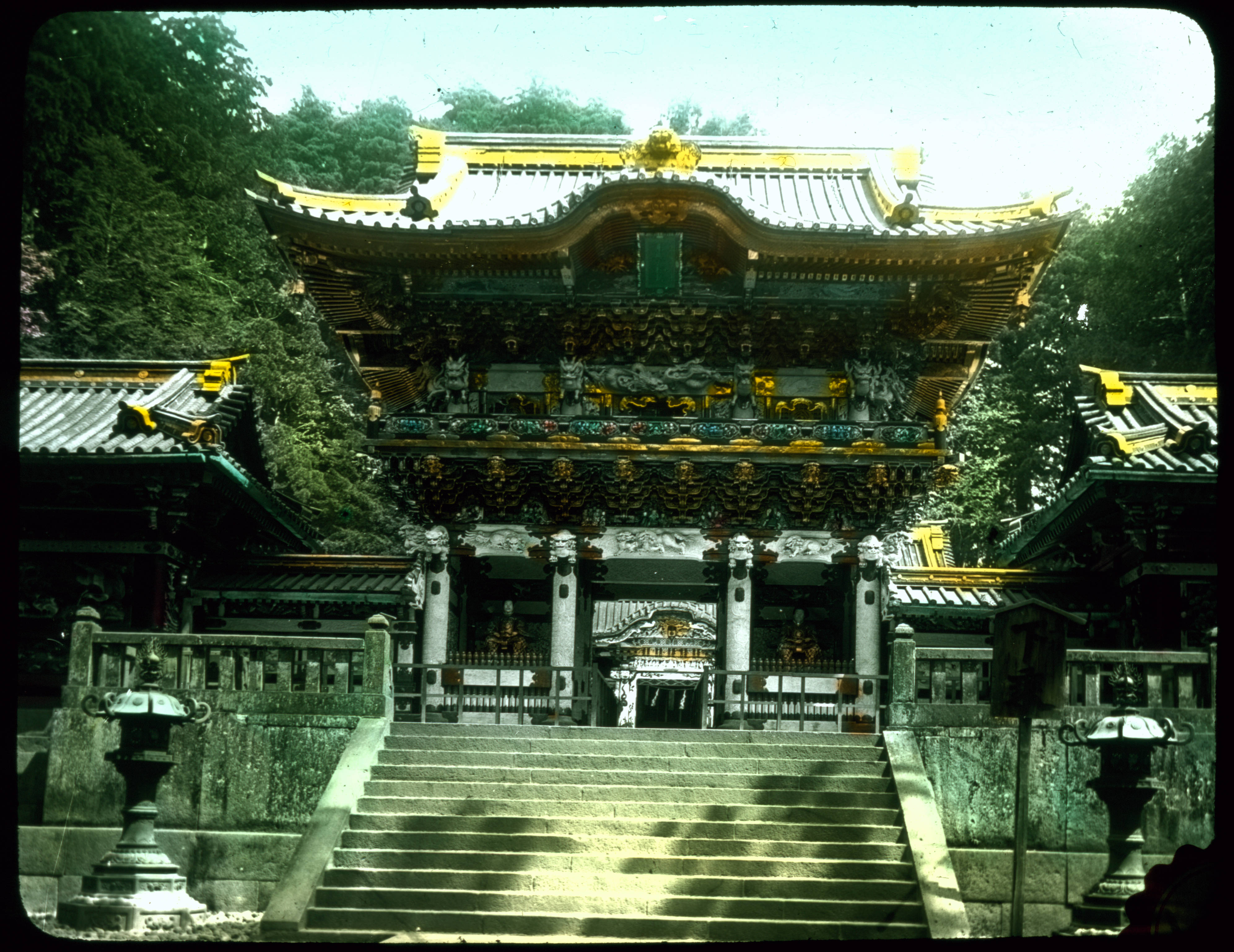
Close-up of ornamental building embellished with gold.

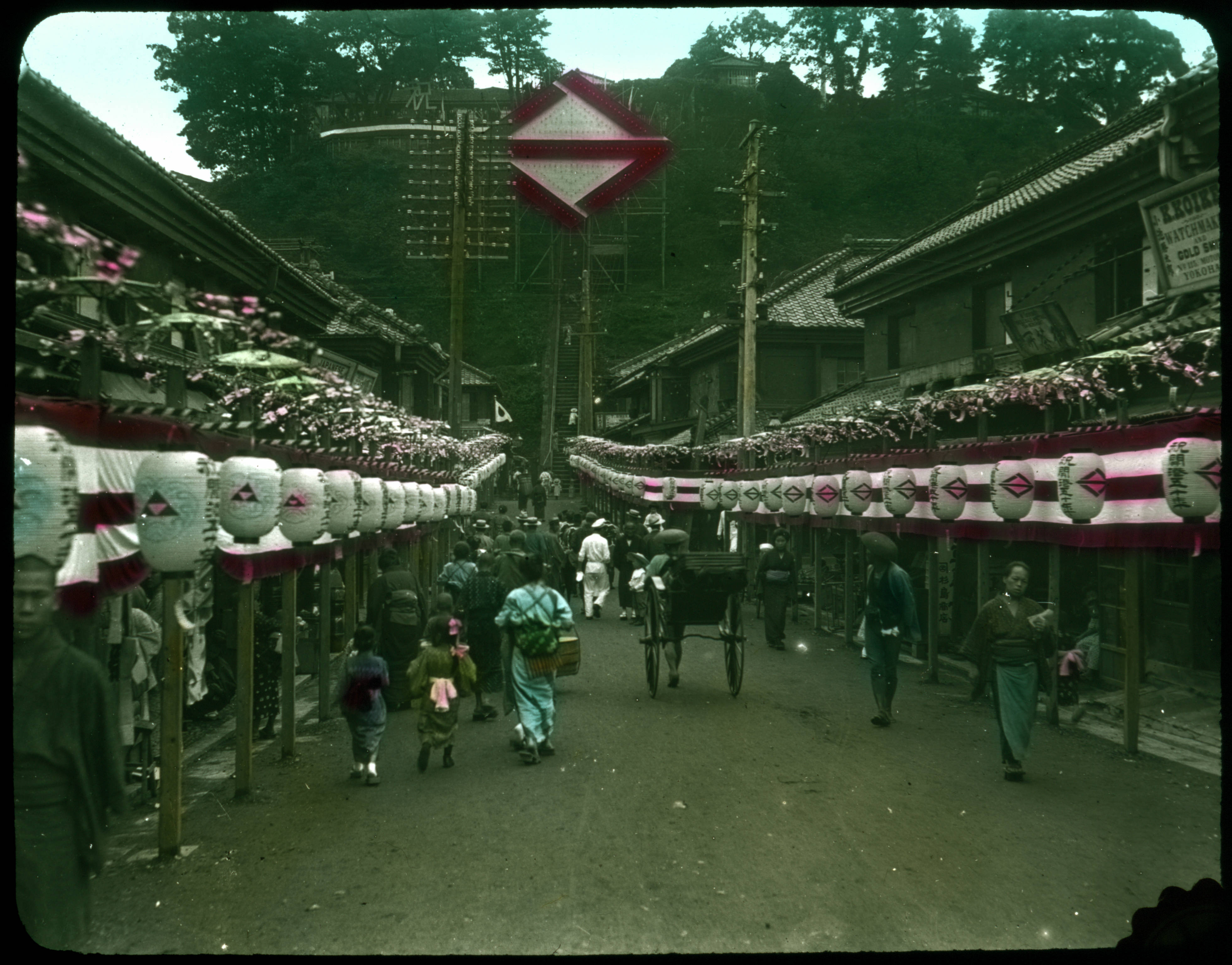
Crowd-filled street lined with banners and lanterns

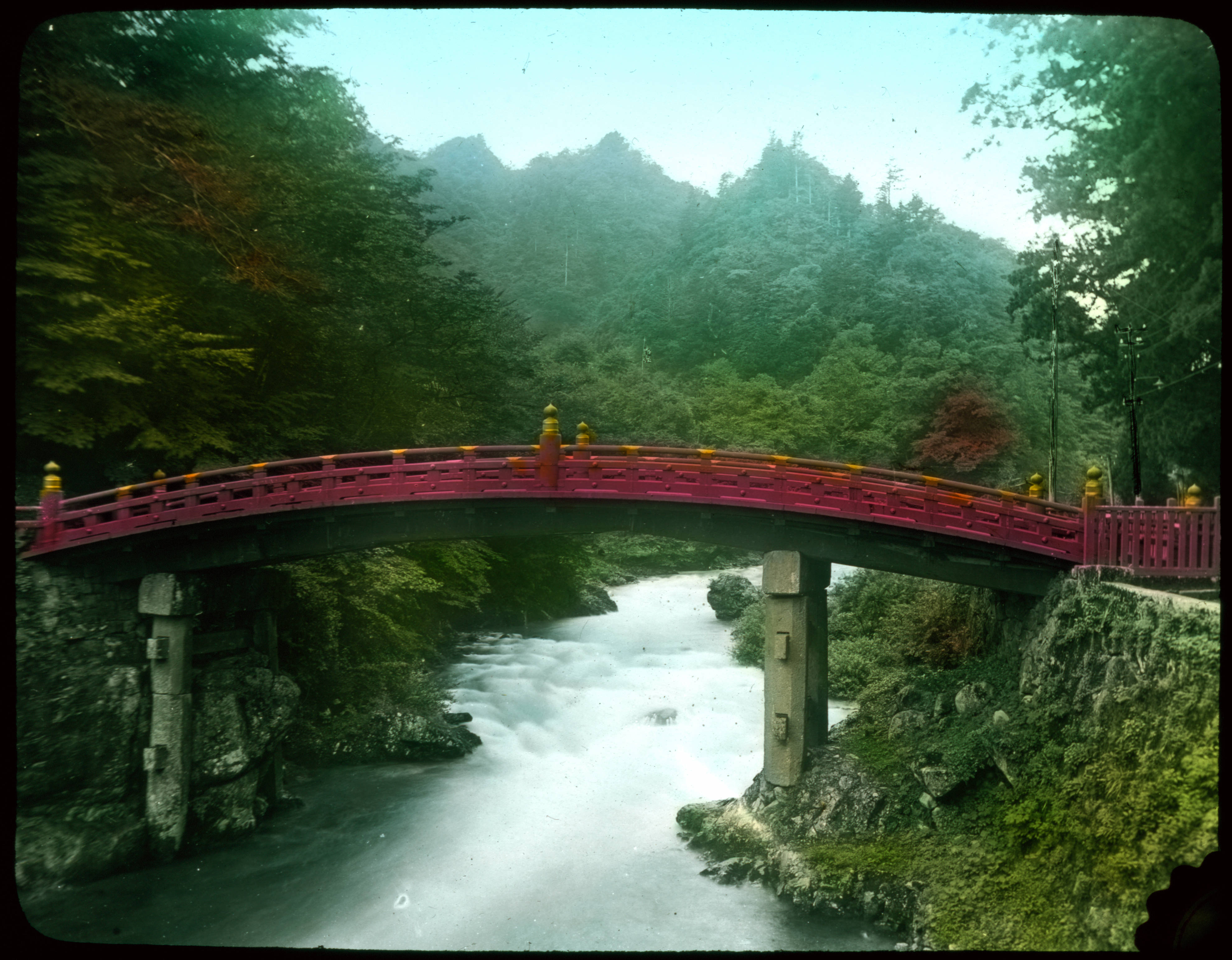
Curved red wooden bridge over river; forest in background

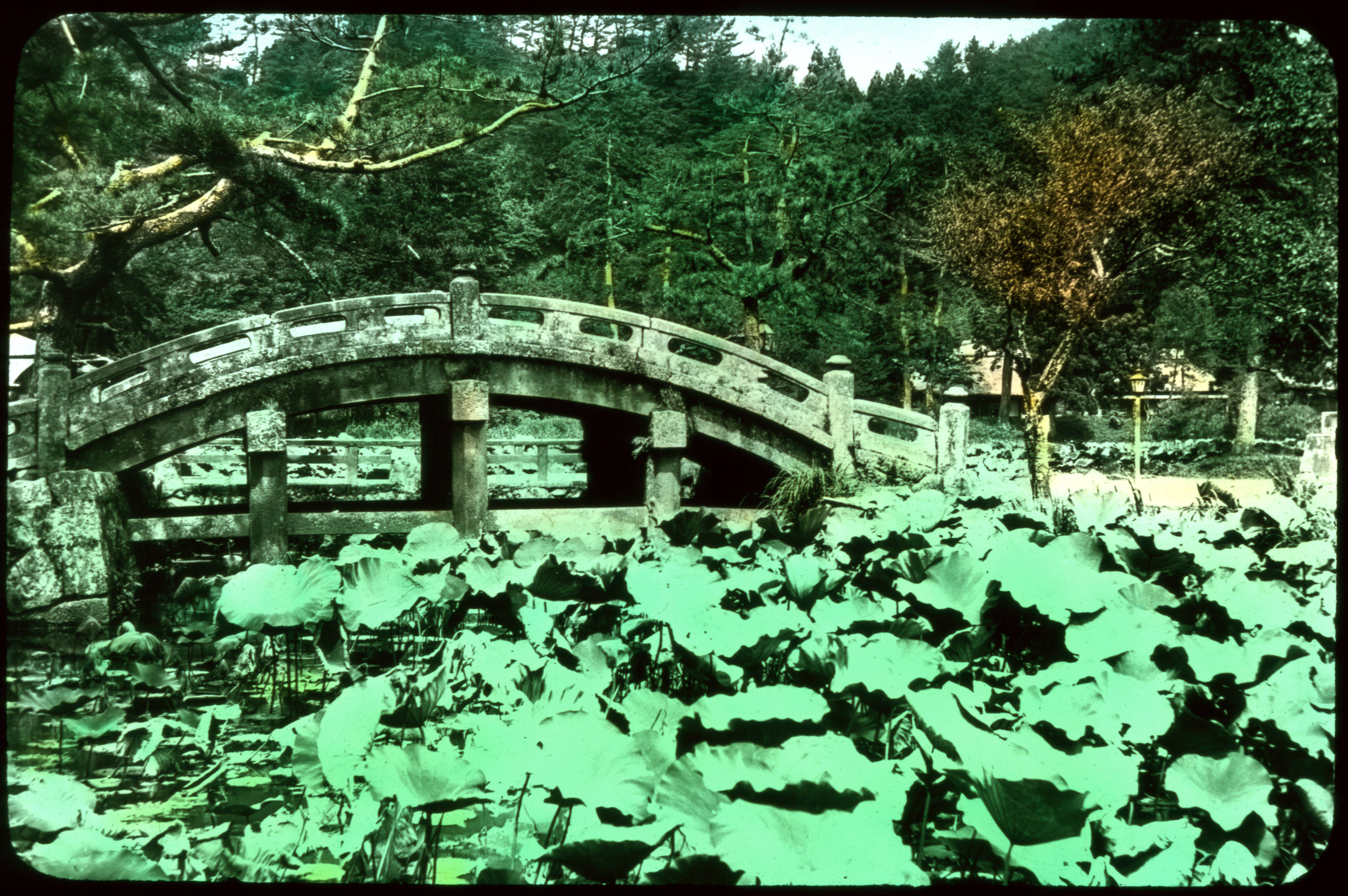
Curved stone bridge in rural area

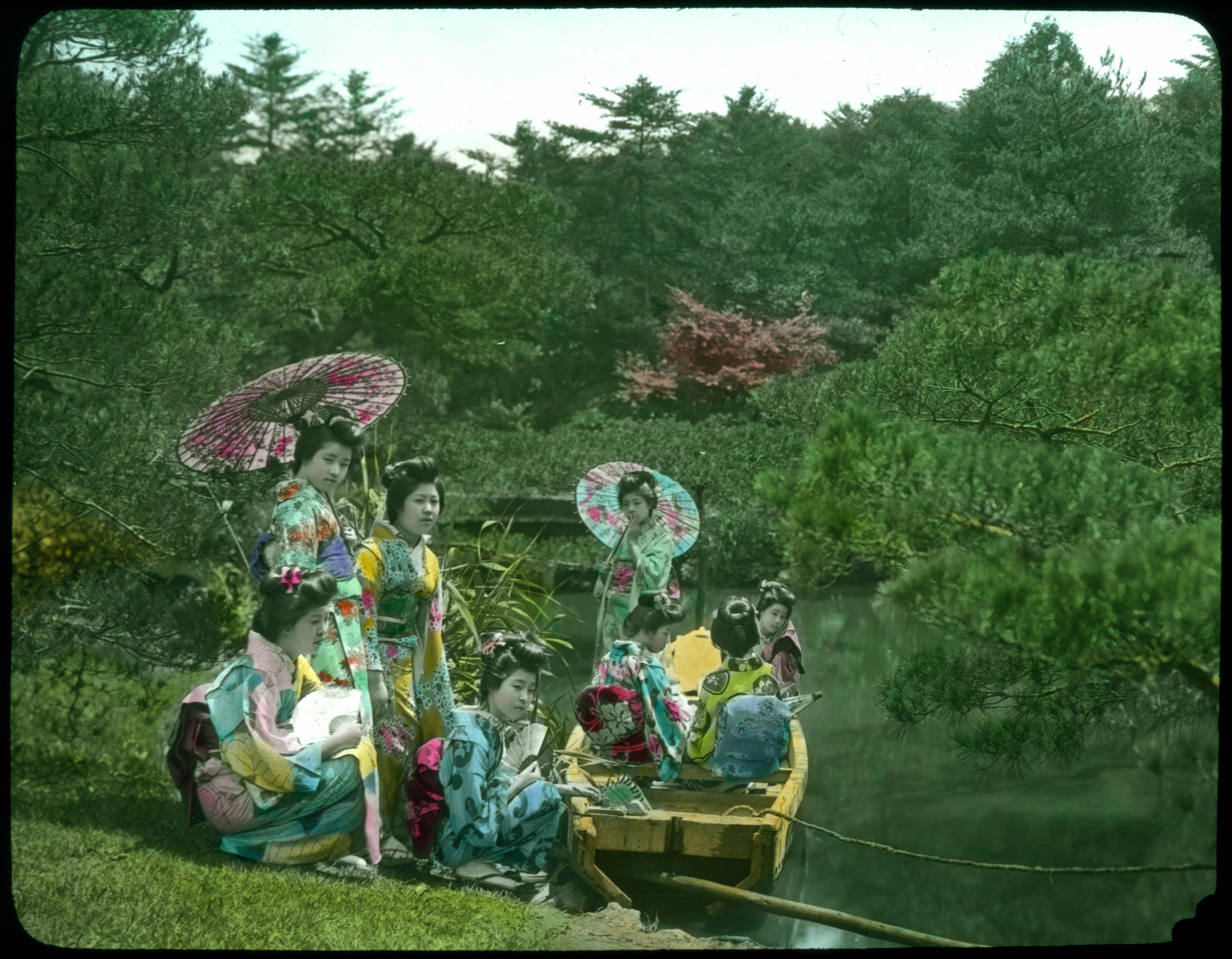
Eight young women in Kimonos, four in wooden boat on water, four on bank beside boat, two of them holding open parasols

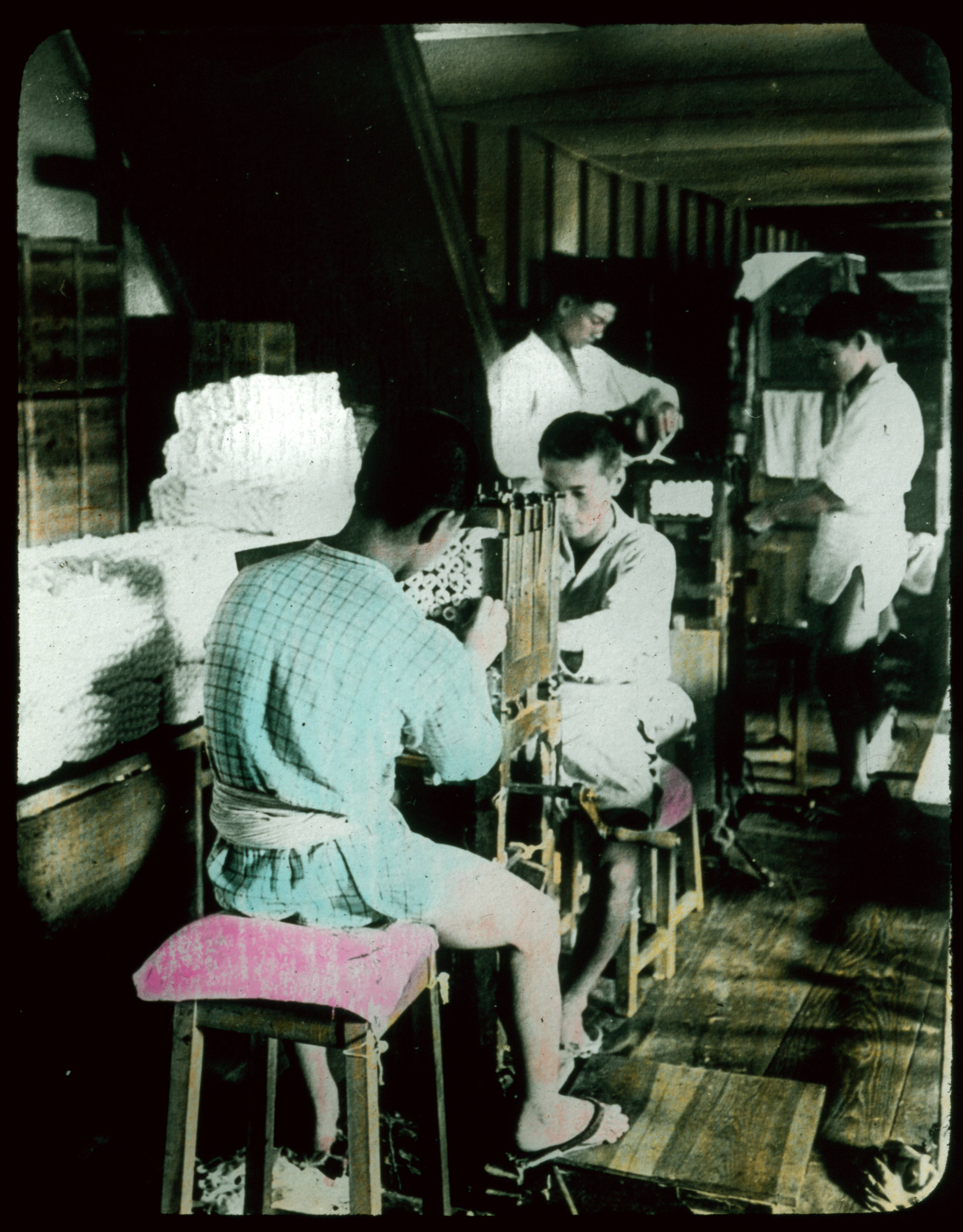
Examining Silk-thread (19955514911).jpg

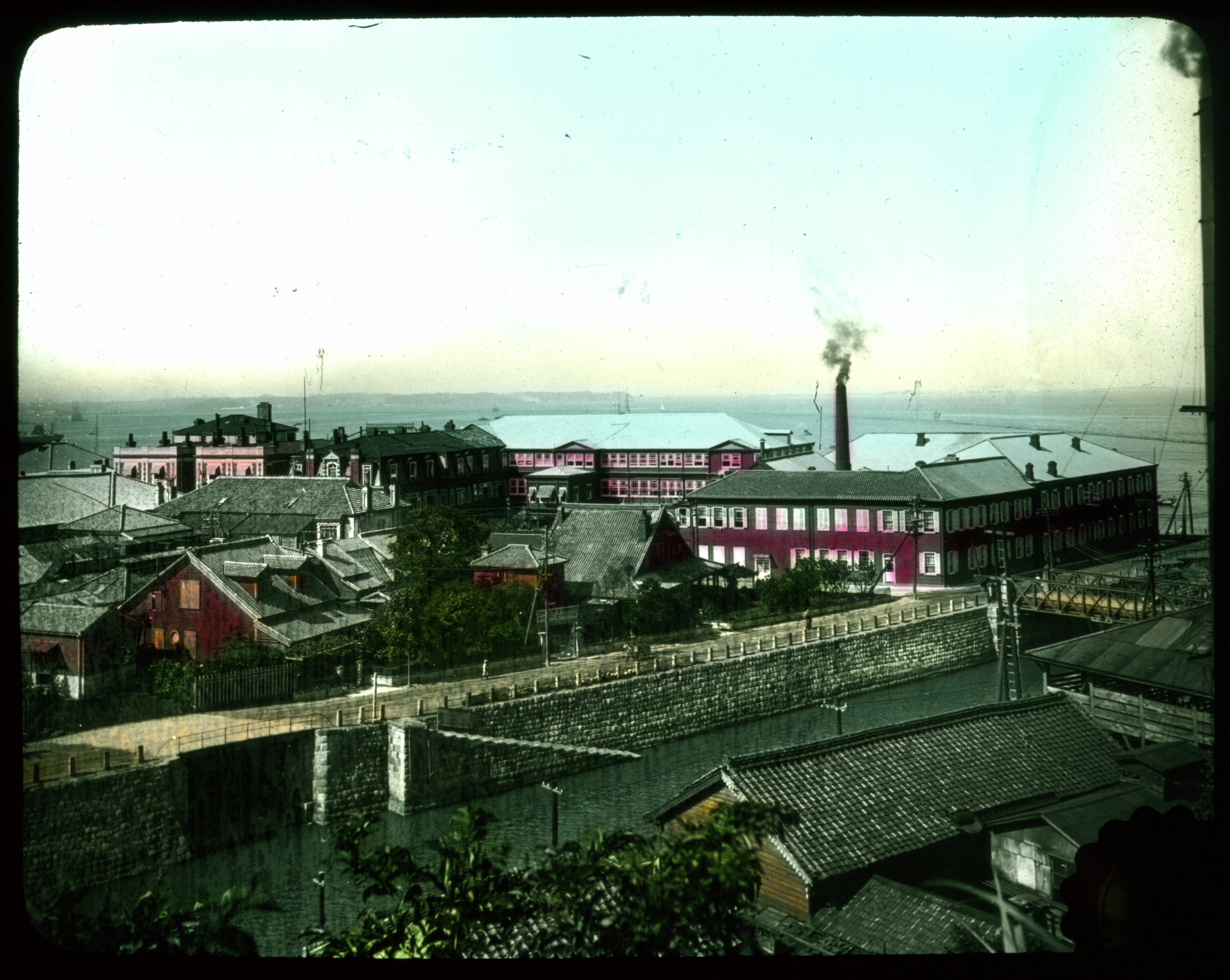
Factories, external view

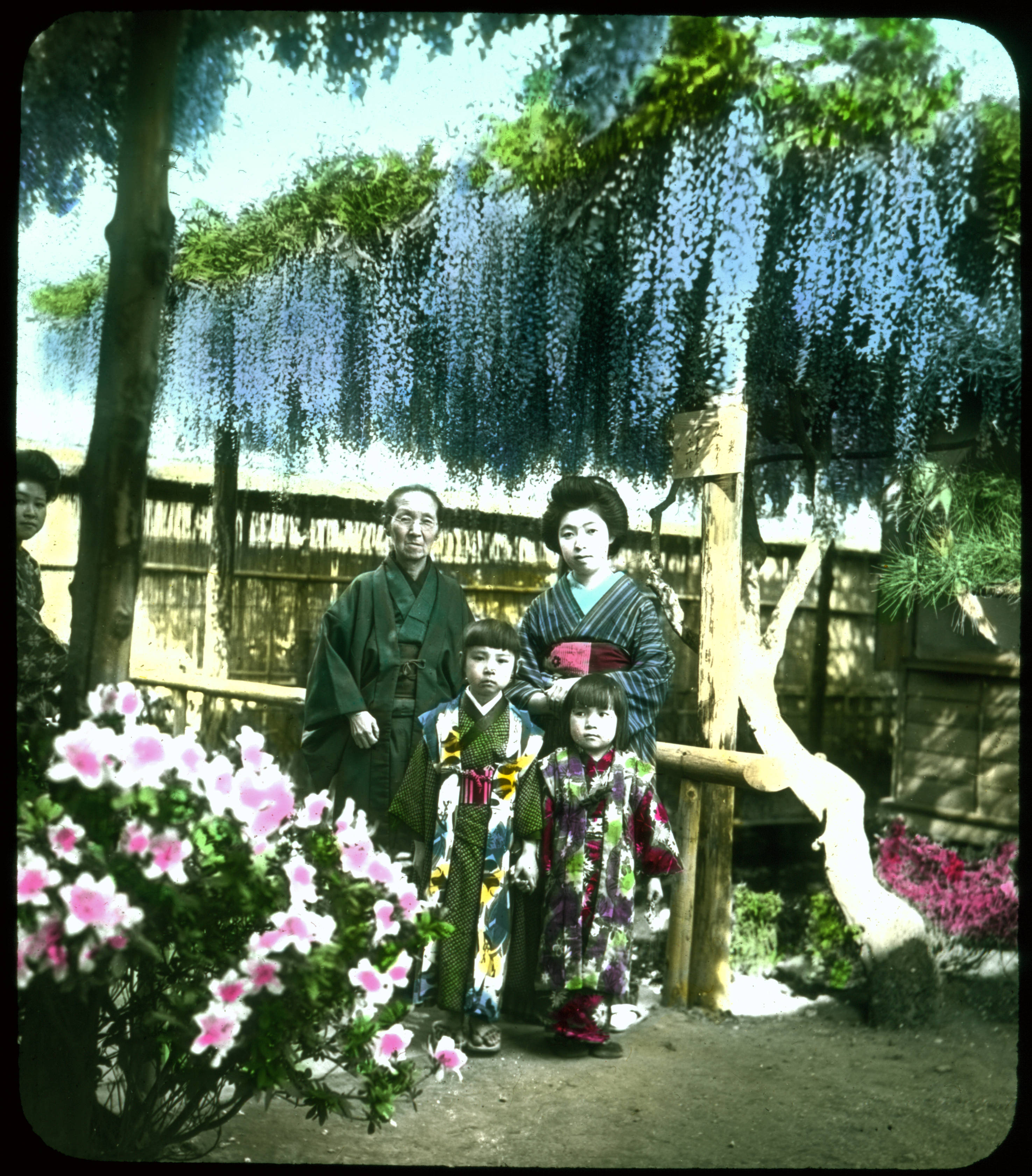
Family in traditional attire having portrait taken in garden against fence

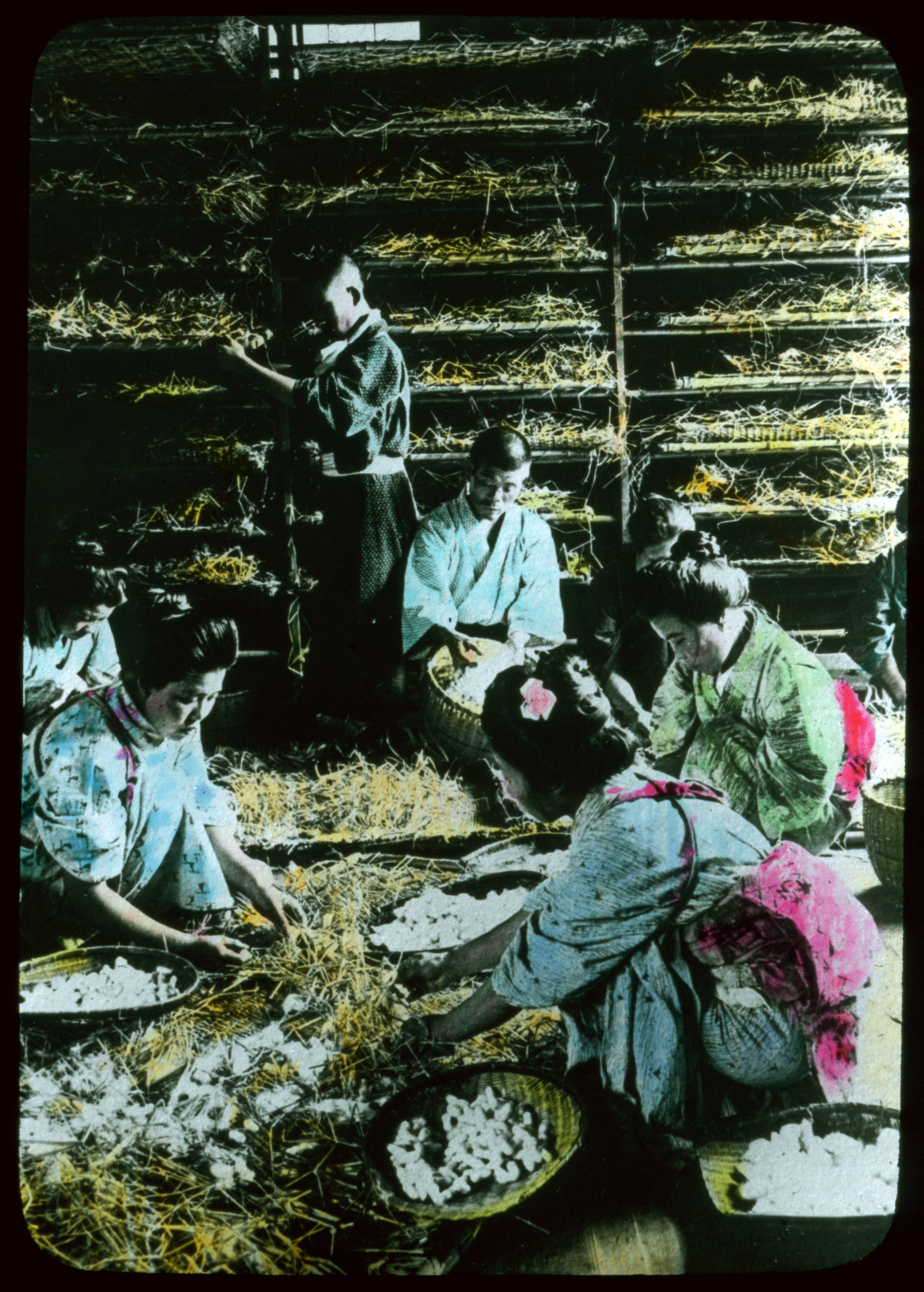
Feeding Silk-Worms

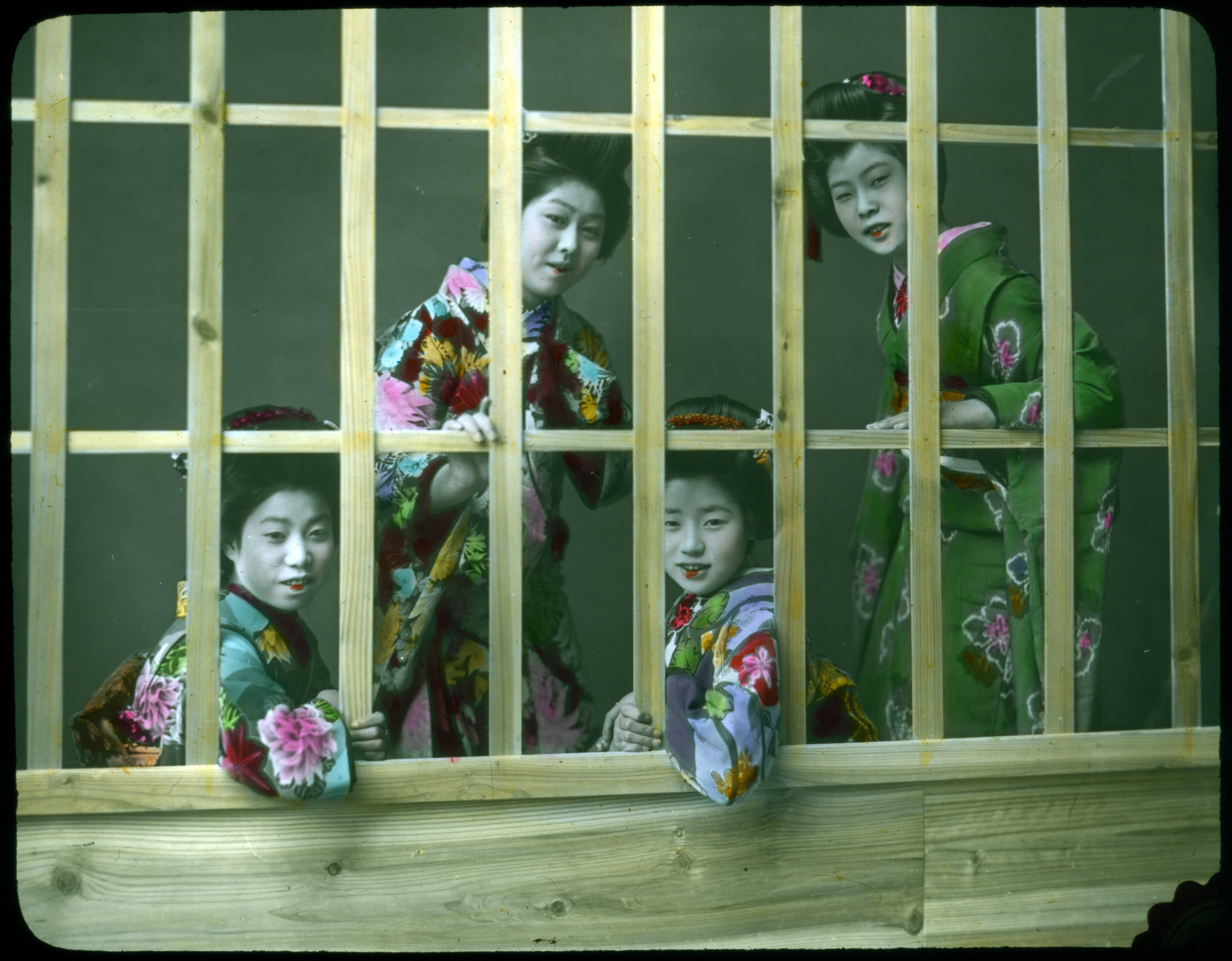
Four women smiling and leaning through openings in lattice work

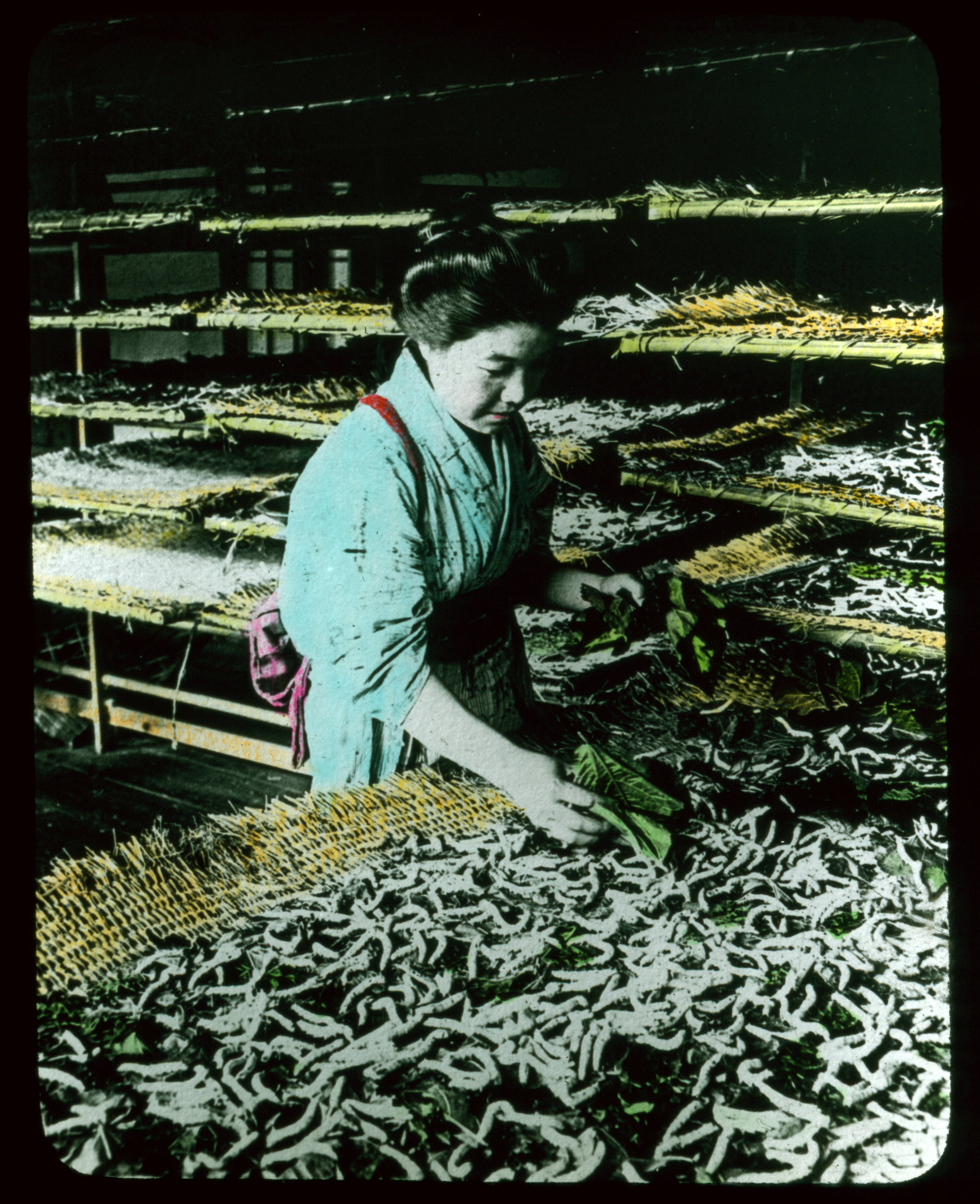
Gathering Cocoons

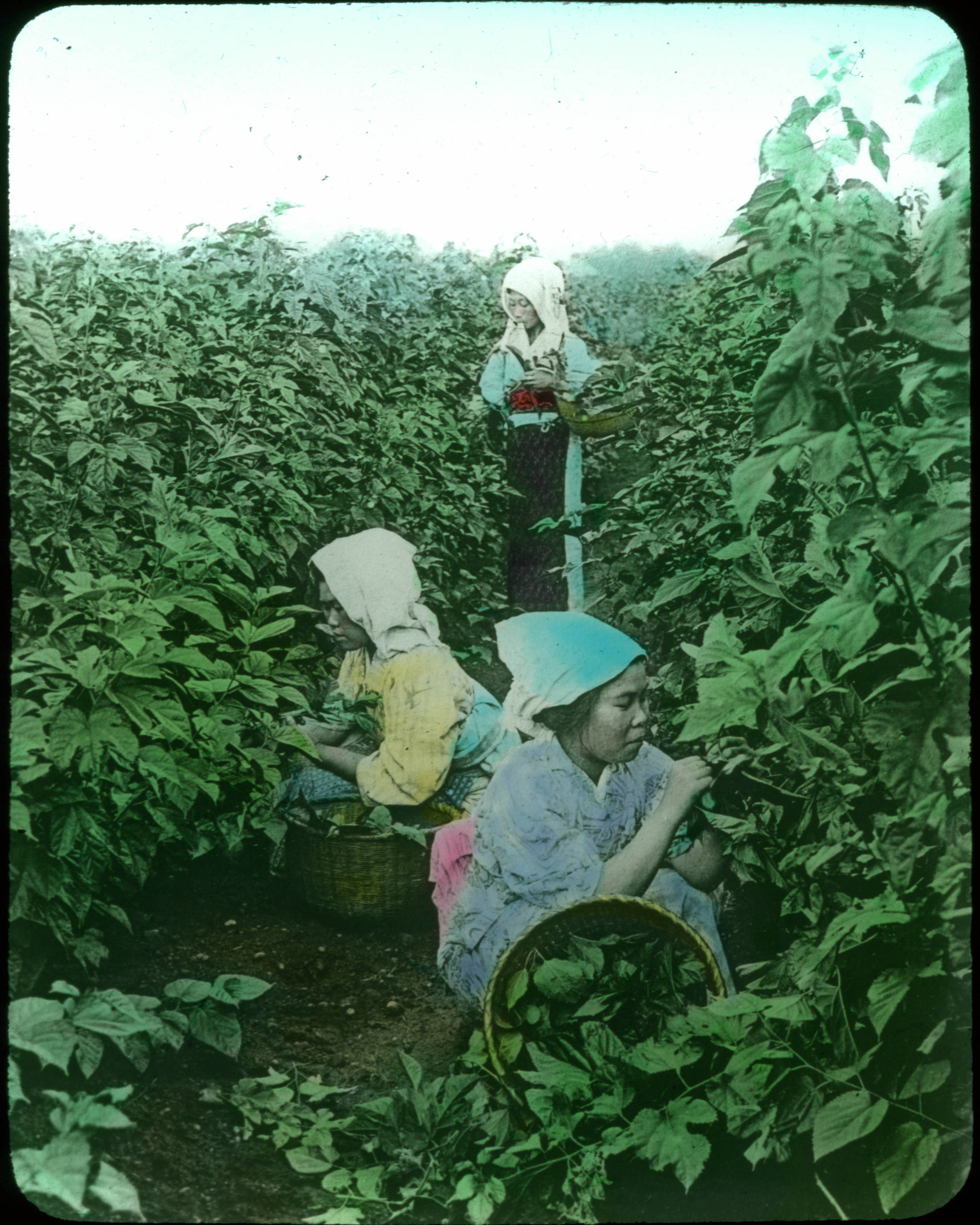
Gathering Mulberry Leaves

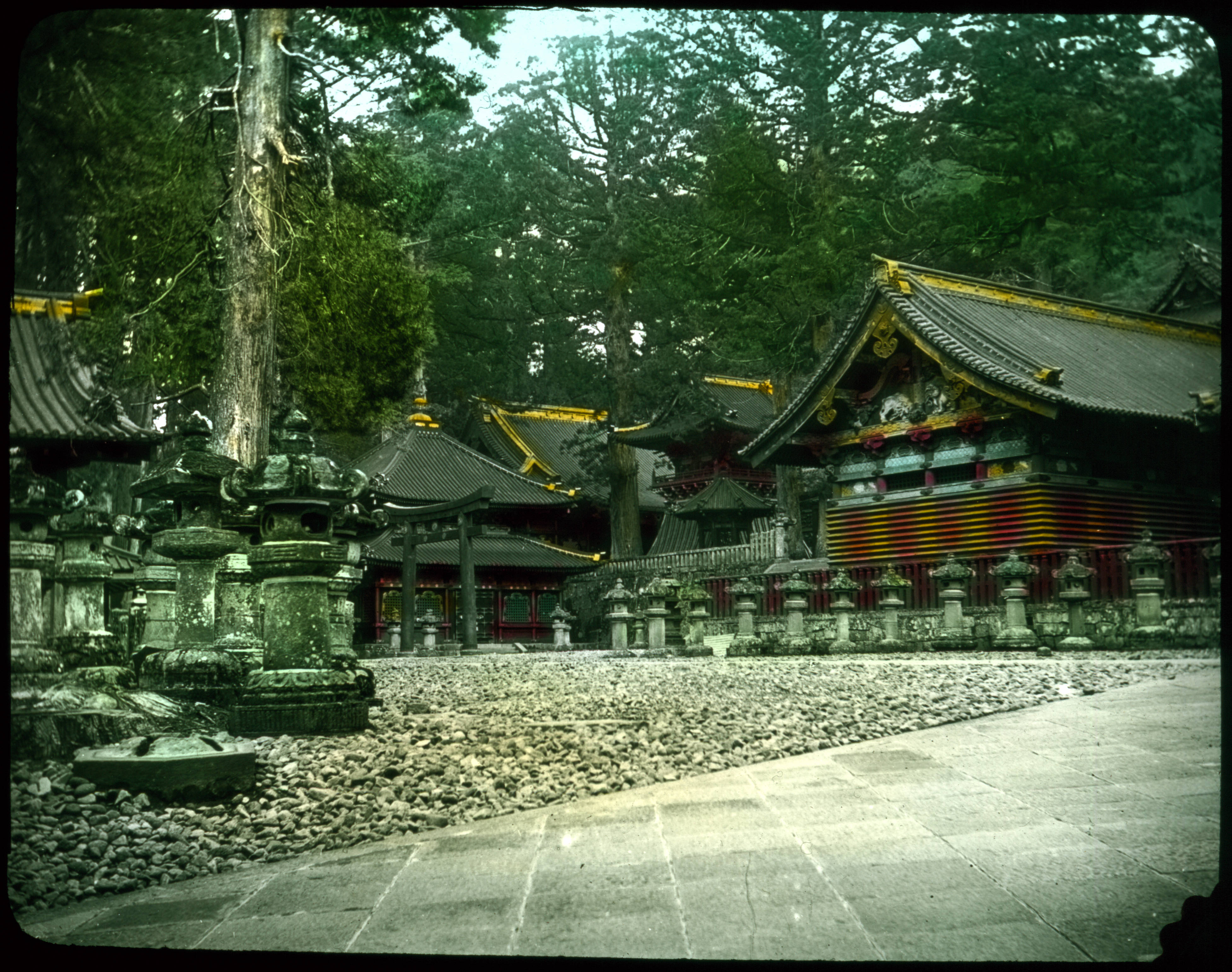
Group of buildings set among trees; ornamental stone wall in front

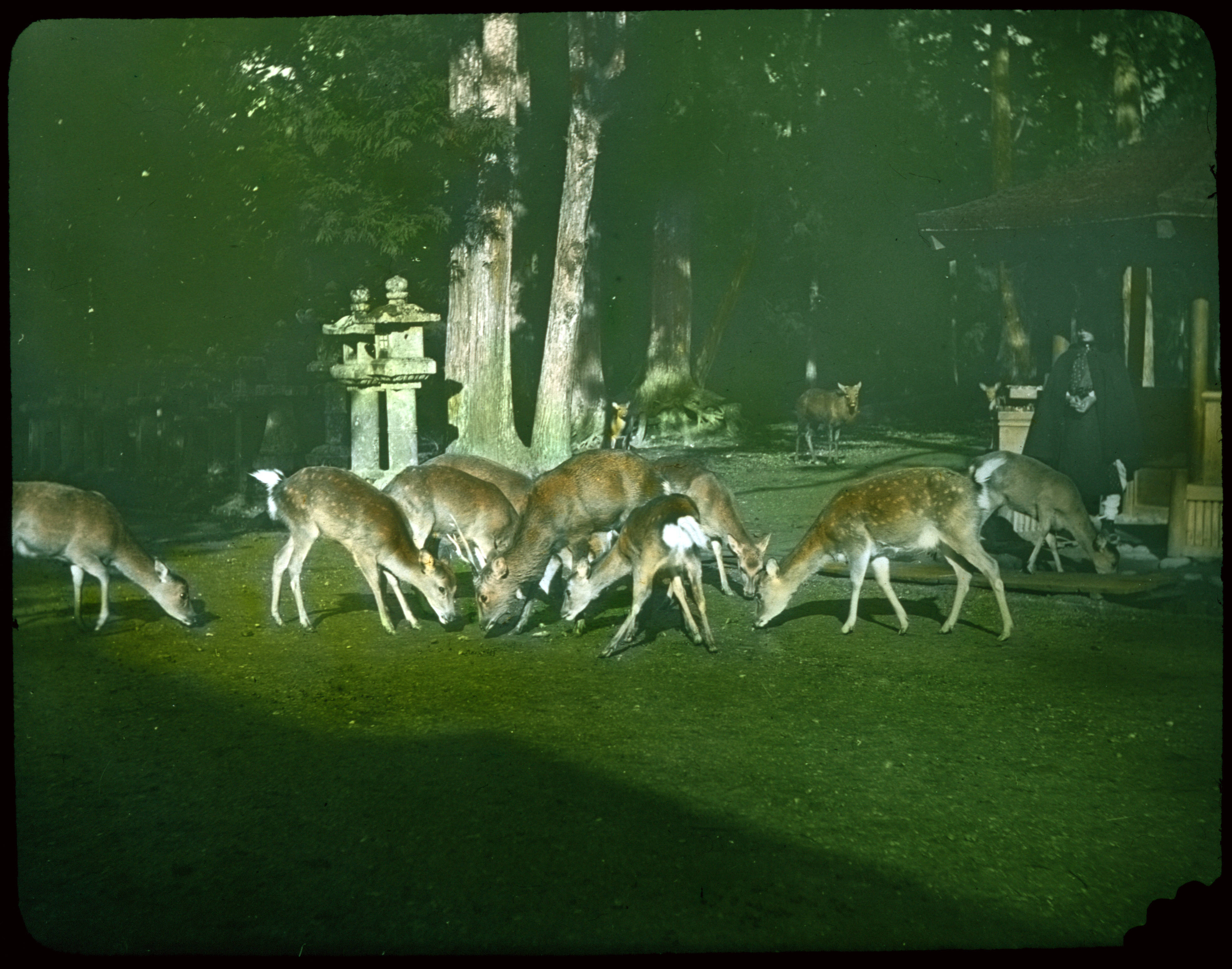
Group of deer feeding on lawn in wooded garden; stone monuments and summer house in mid-ground

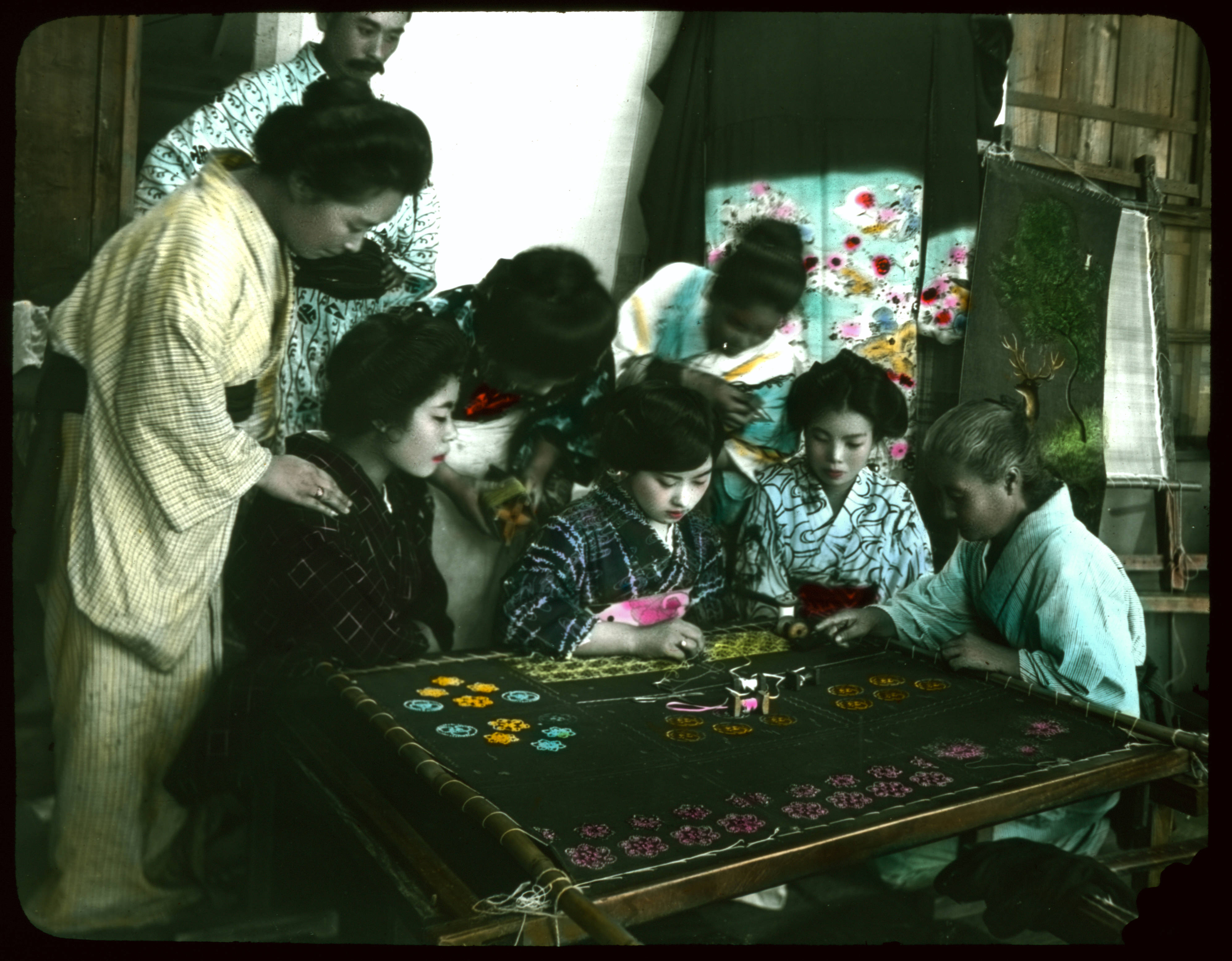
Group of women and one man watching young woman working on large embroidery

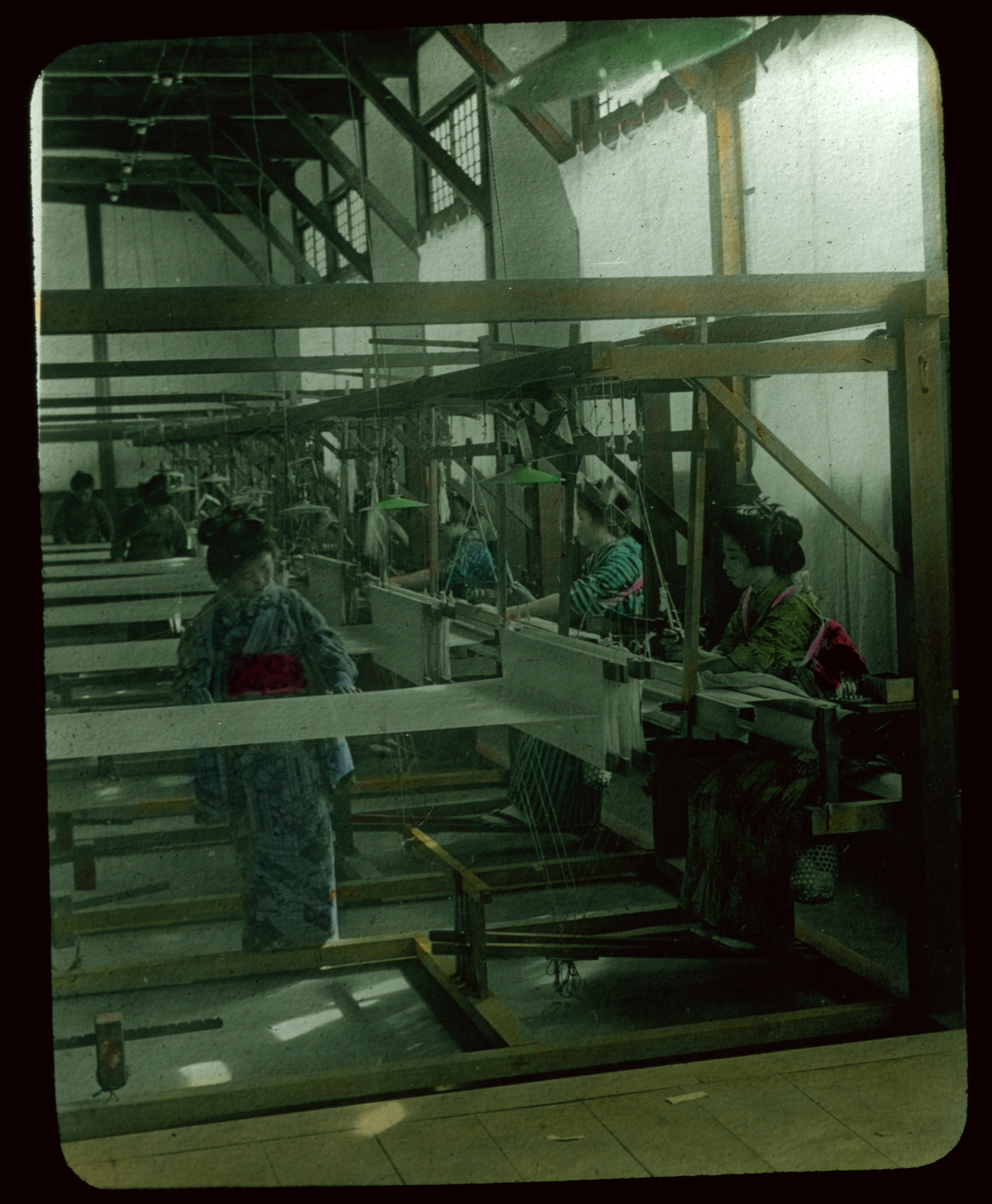
Hand-weaving in factory

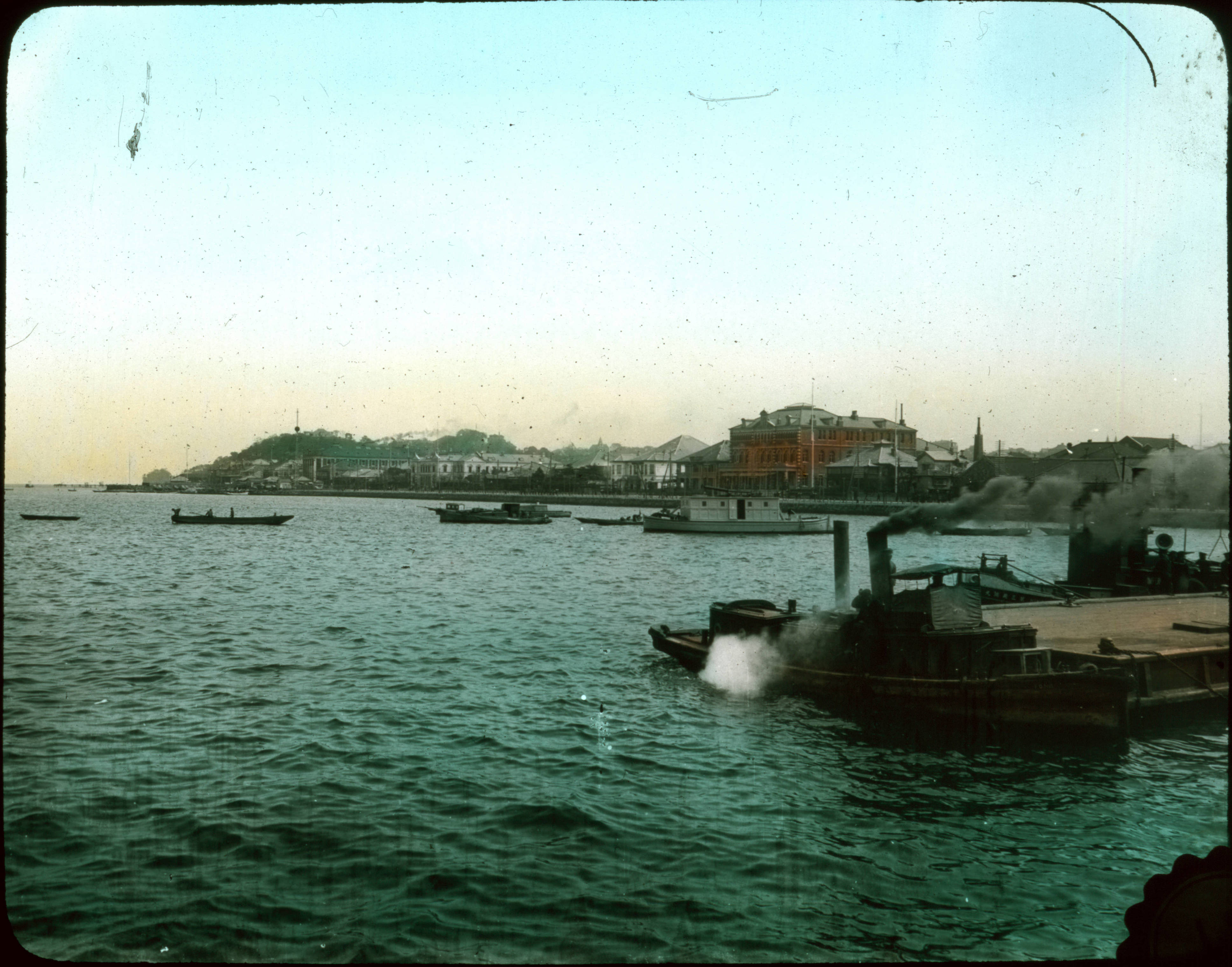
Harbour of city; jetty with steamboats in foreground; other boats and buildings in background

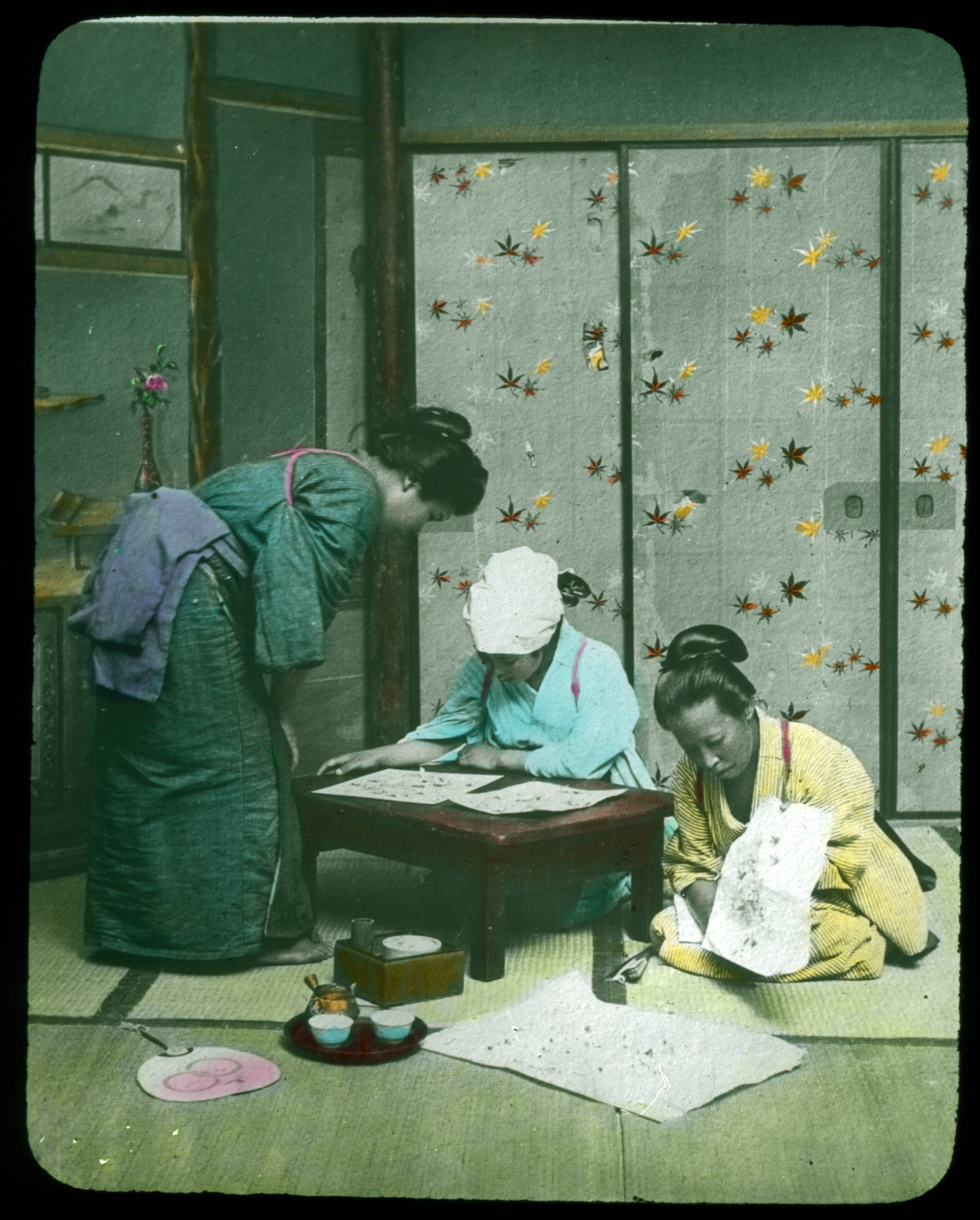
Hatching of Silk-Worm Eggs

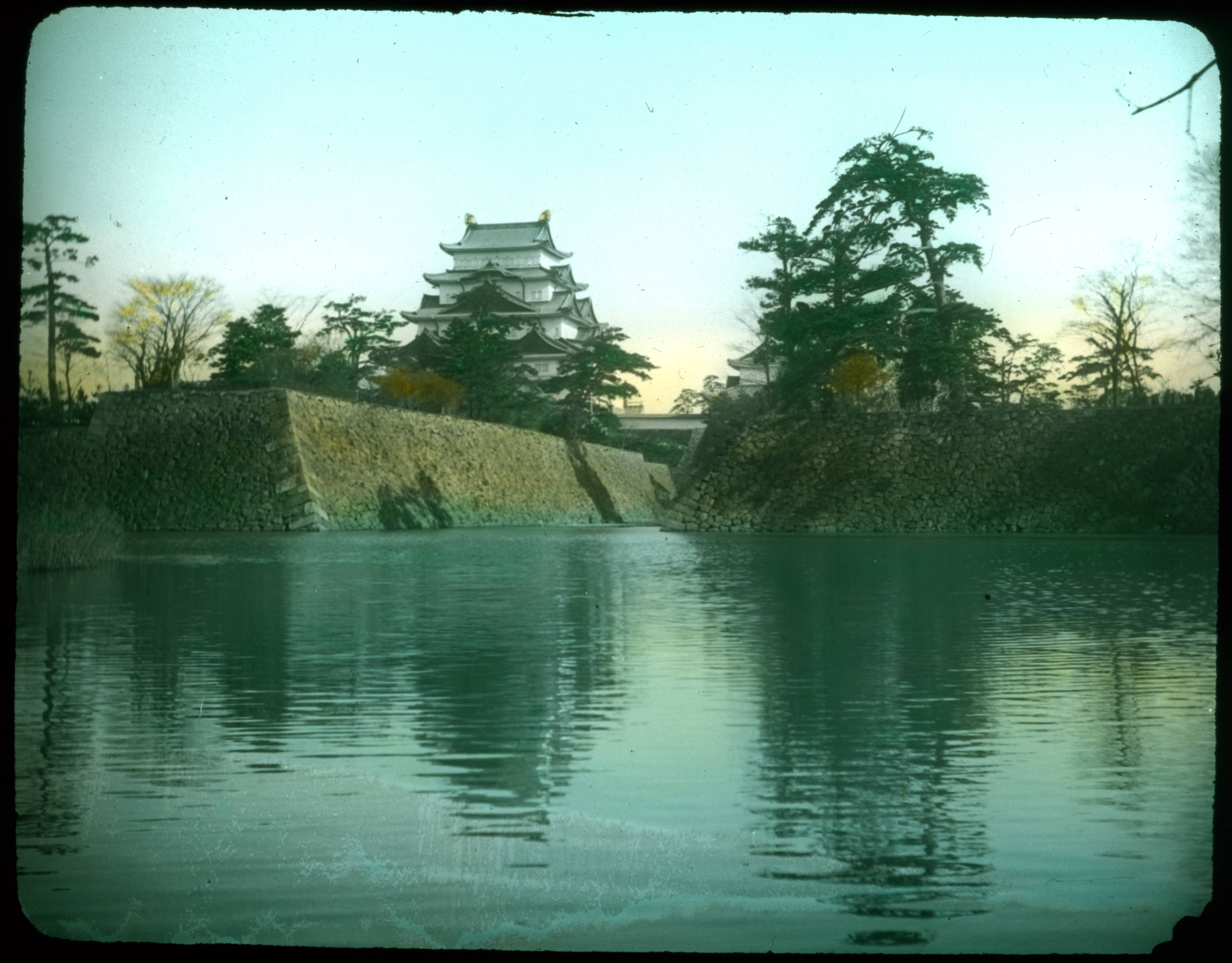
High stone embankments above river; line of trees on top of each embankments; tall building with temple roofs on one side; another building hidden behind trees on other side

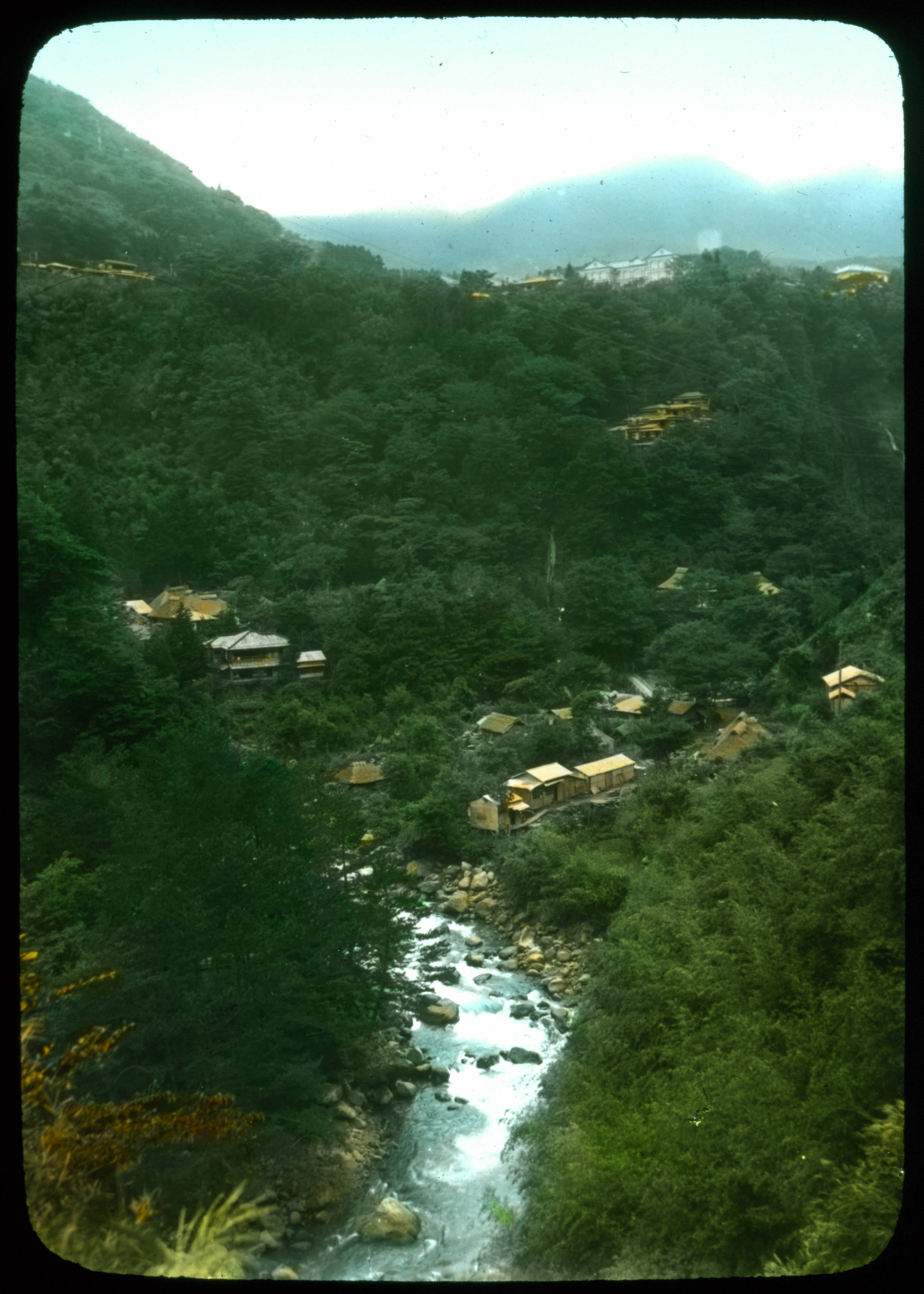
Houses in the woods, river in foreground

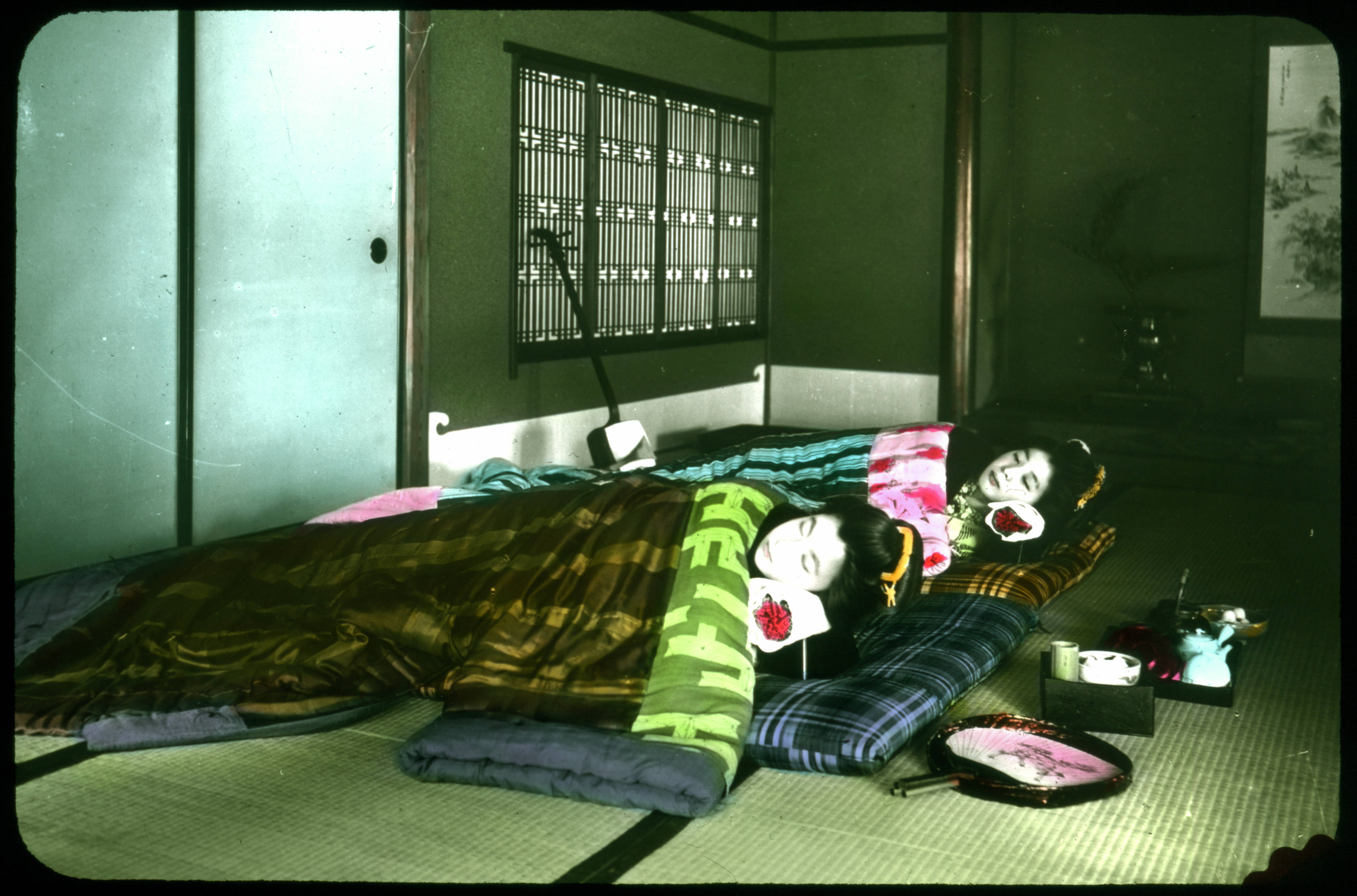
Interior shot of two geishas asleep in bedding on floor mats; musical instrument, fan and implements for tea ceremony nearby

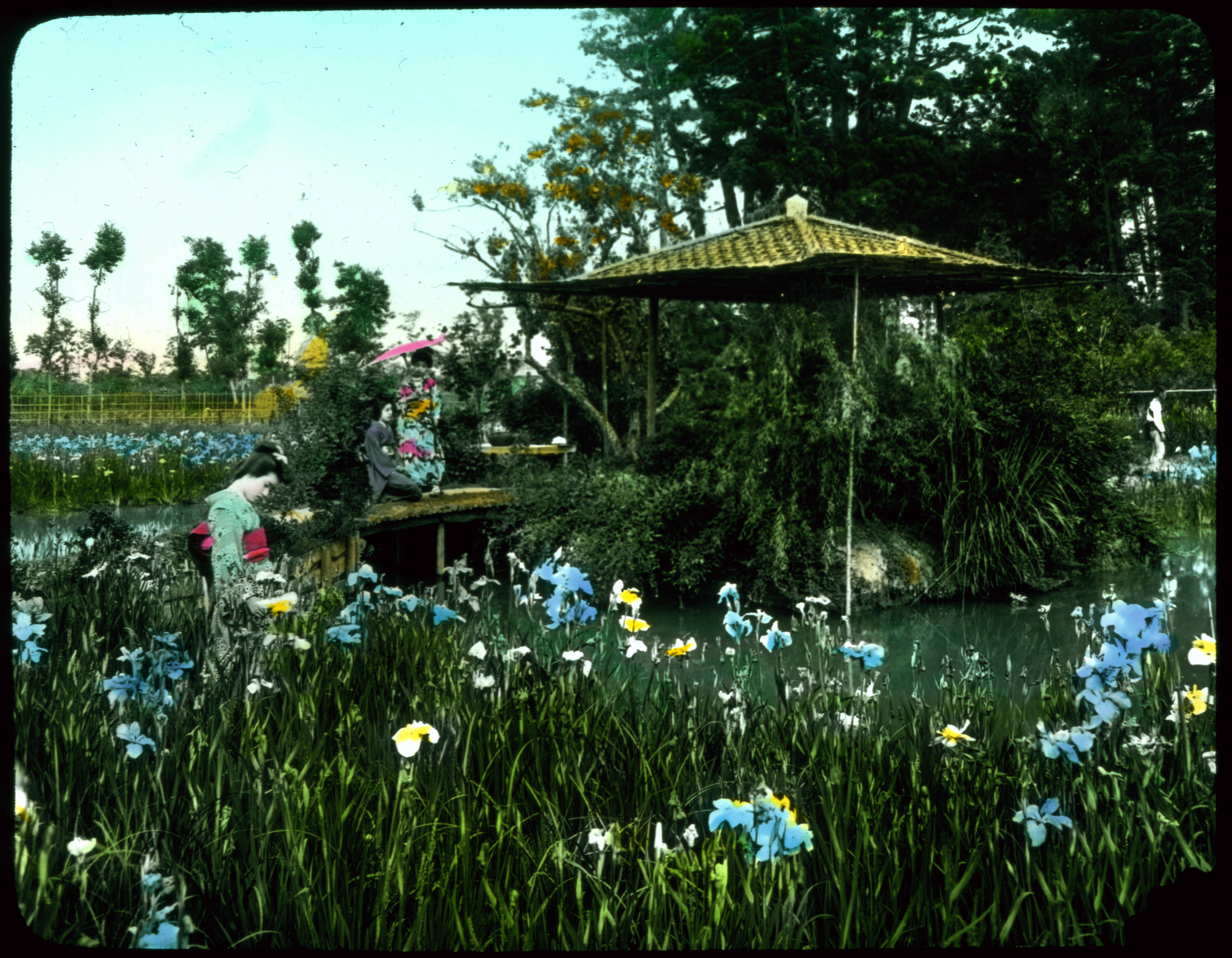
Iris garden beside water; wooden bridge to small roofed island; two women in Kimonos on bridge and one standing among flowers

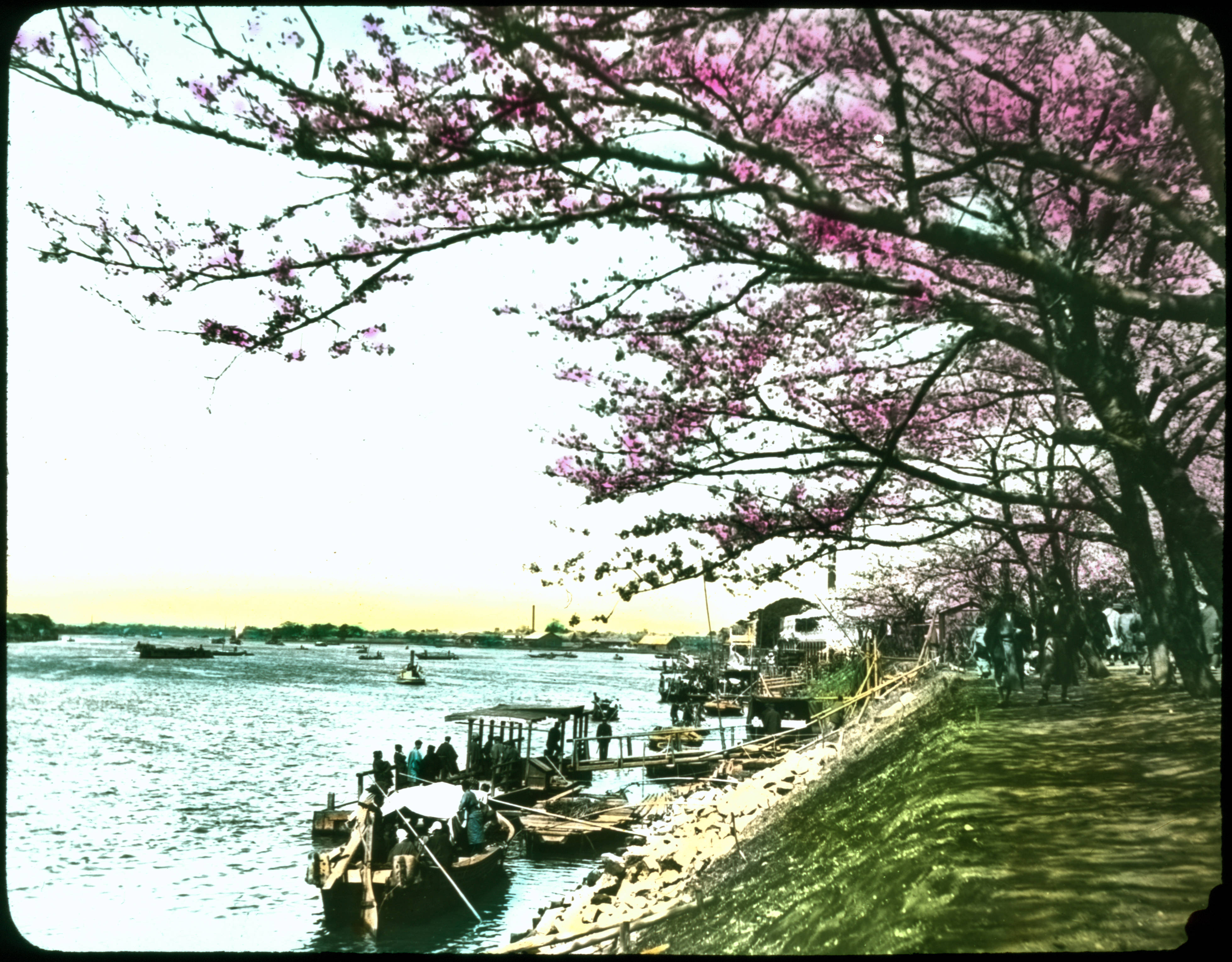
Japanese cherry trees in blossom on grassy bank beside waterways; people strolling under trees; docks and boats with people

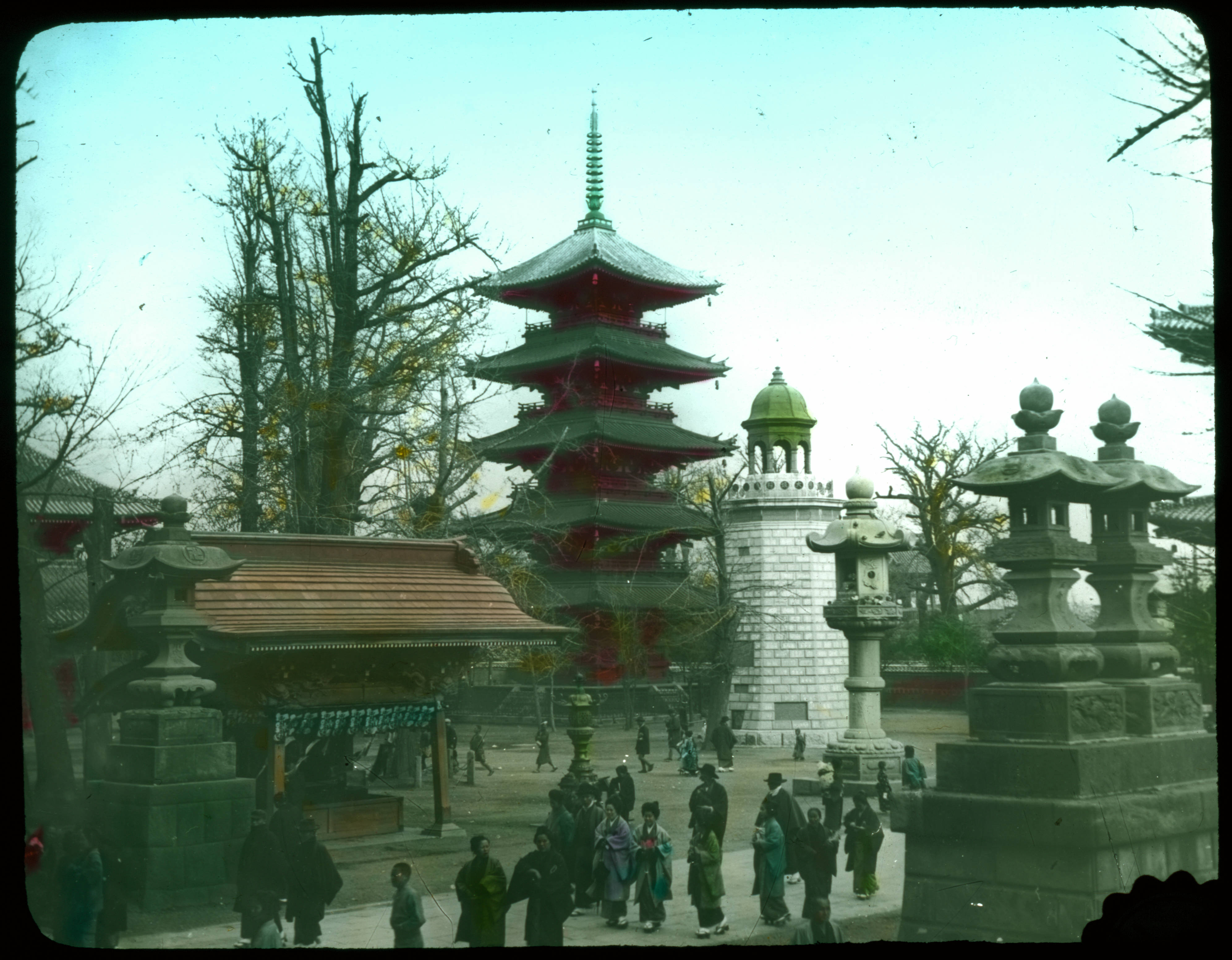
Japanese people (including some men in western dress) strolling through paved grounds among large stone lanterns; temples and pagoda

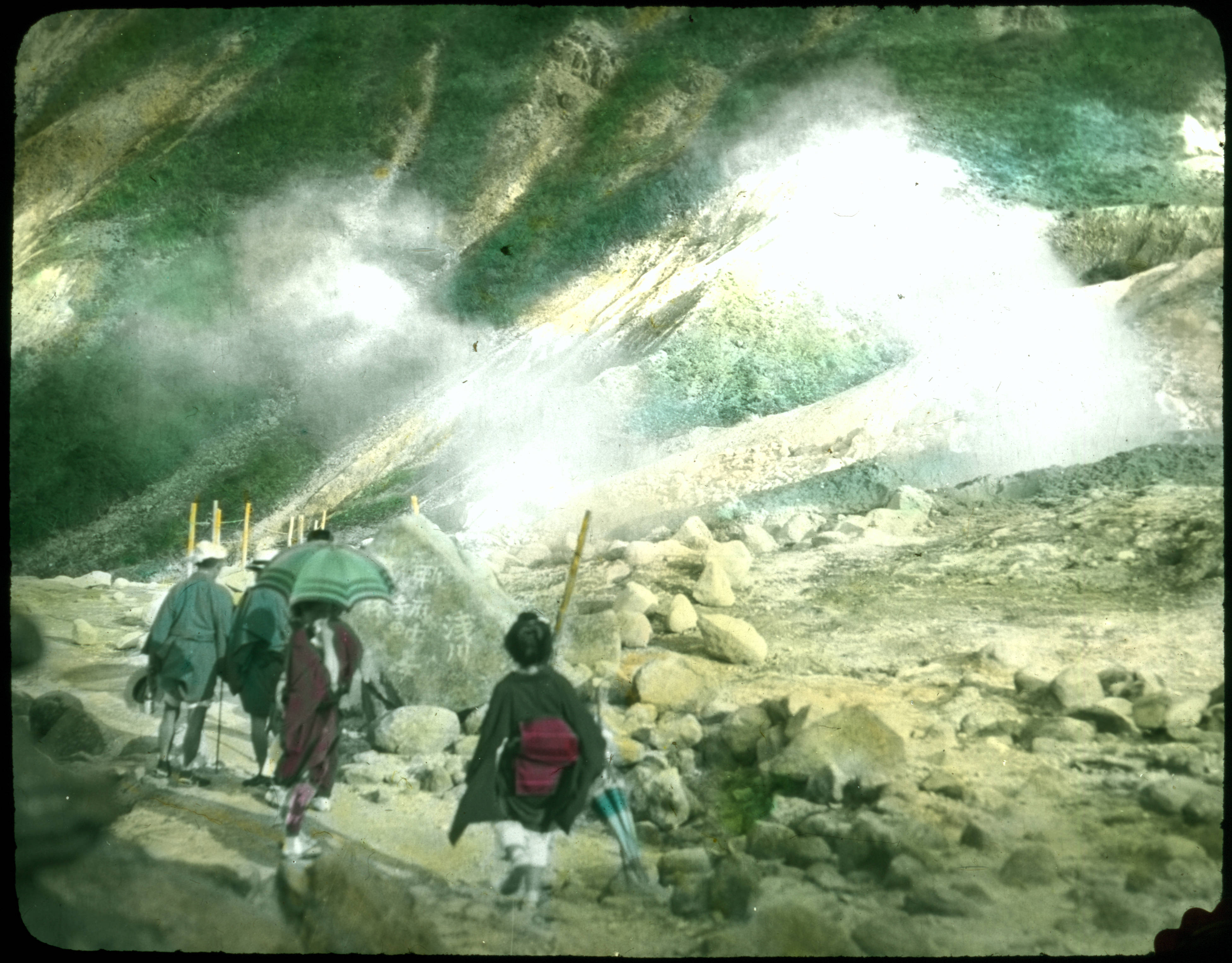
Japanese people in local attire hiking through mountains

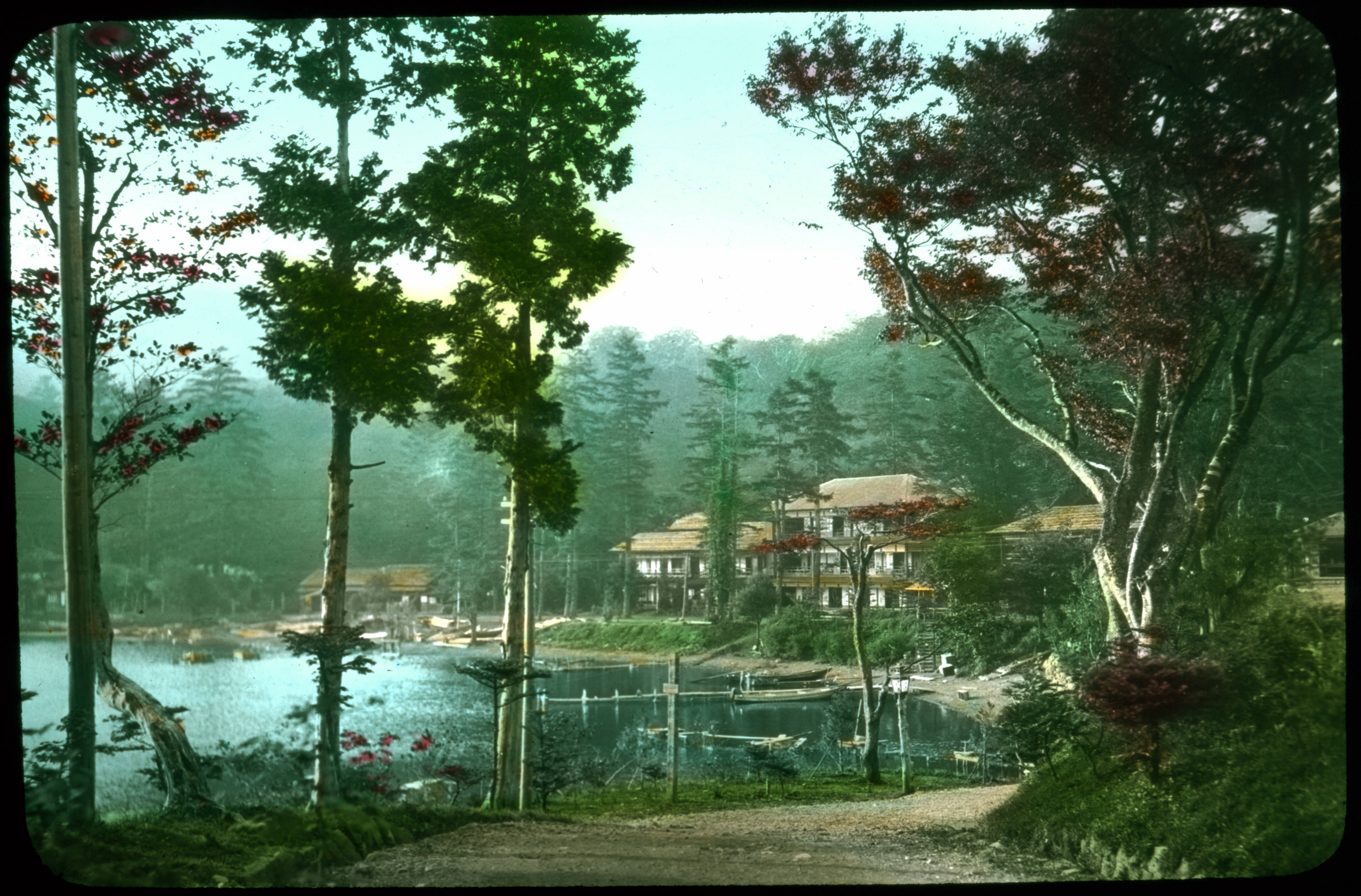
Lake side resort

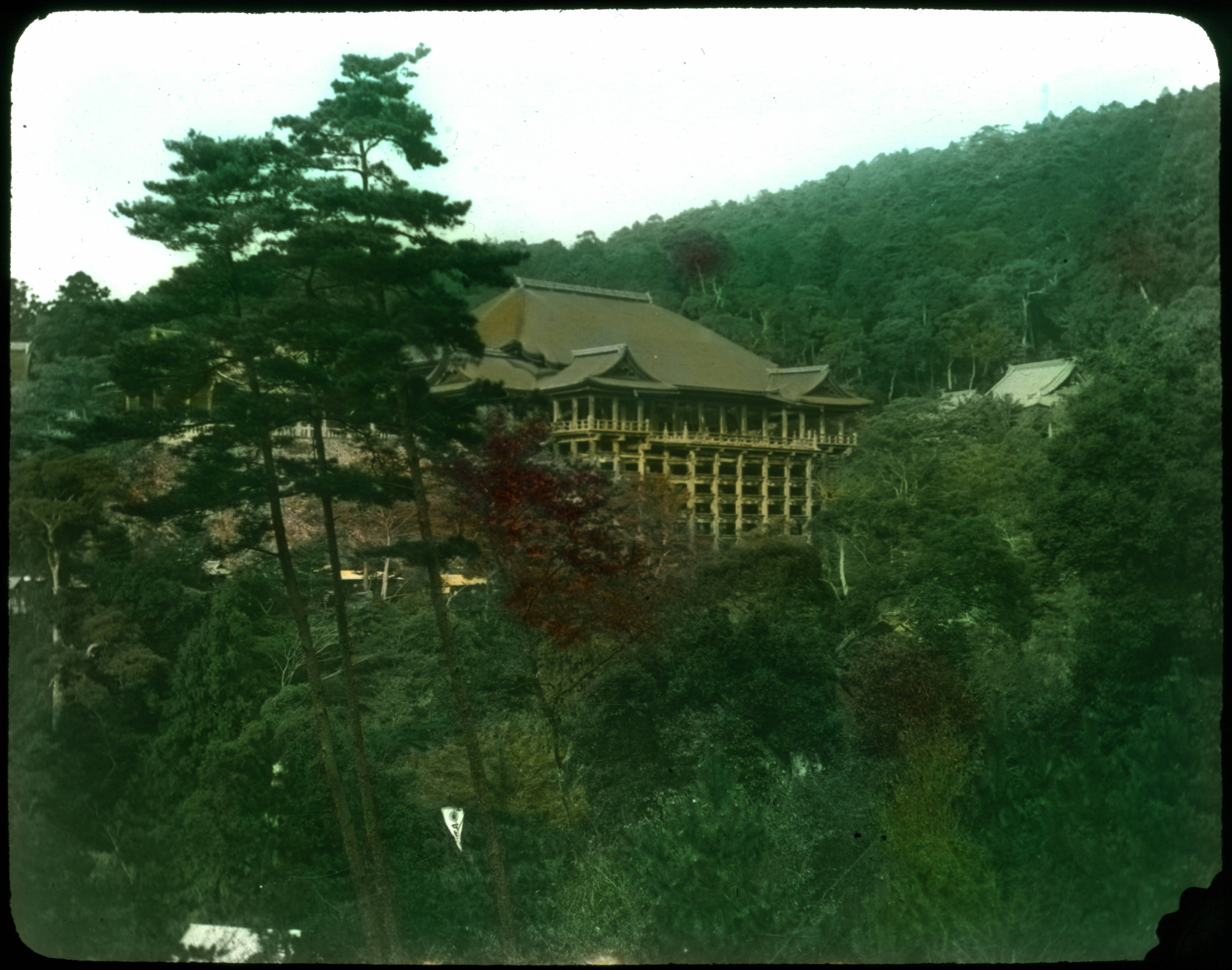
Large building (temple?) in wooded setting

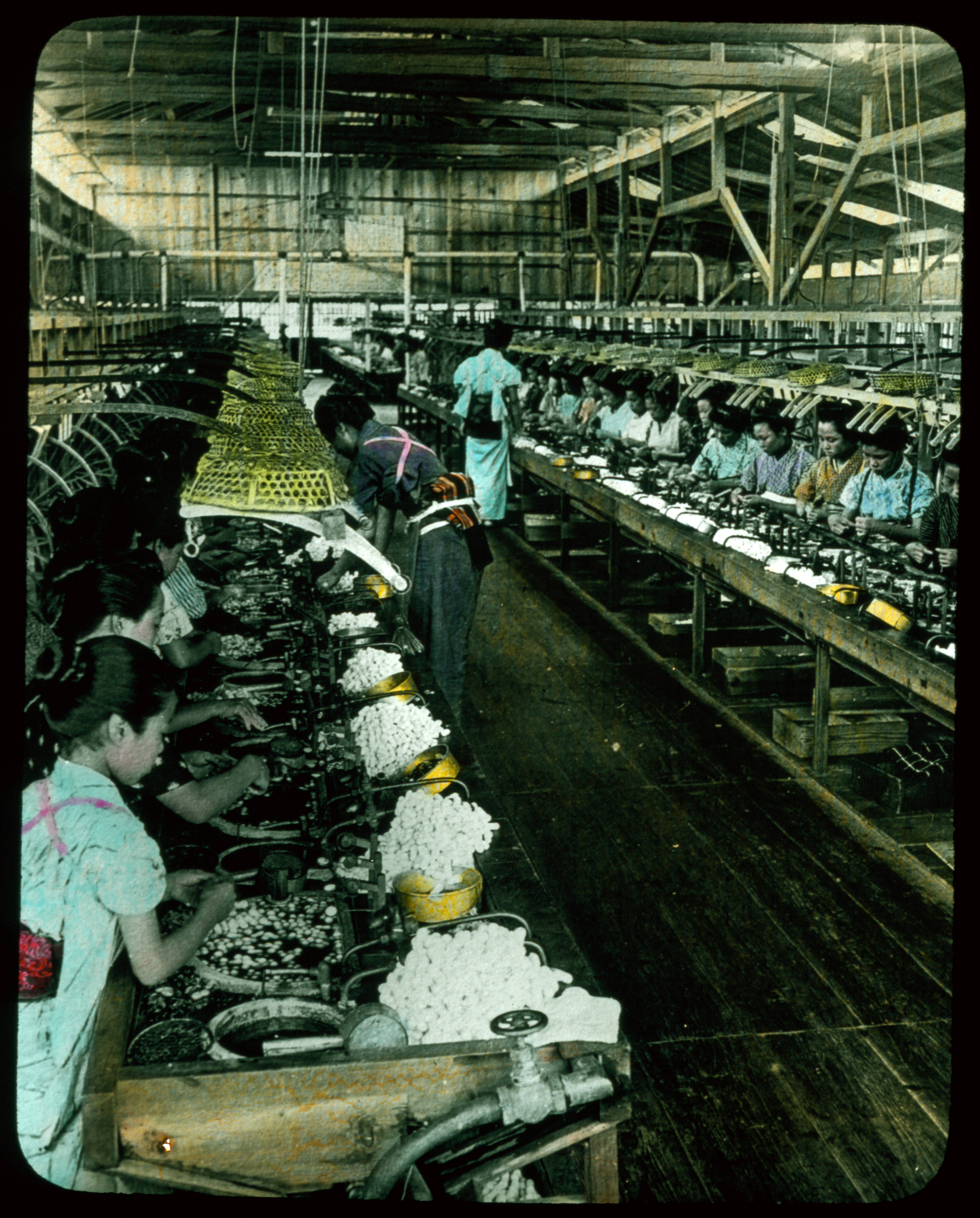
Large Silk Factory

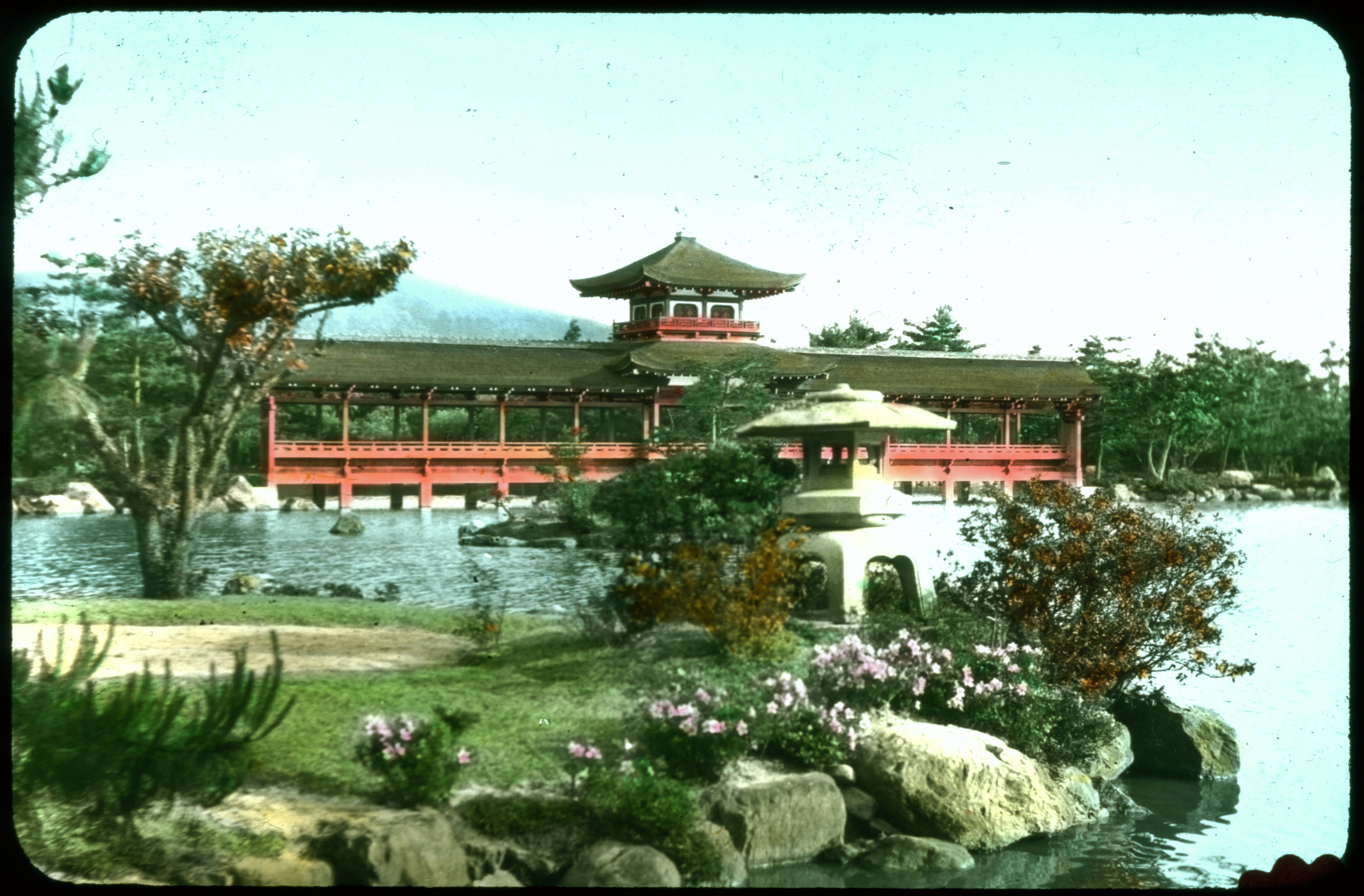
Long red wooden covered bridge with ornamental roof; woods on either side of bridge, woods and mountain behind; water and landscaped point of land with flowers in foreground

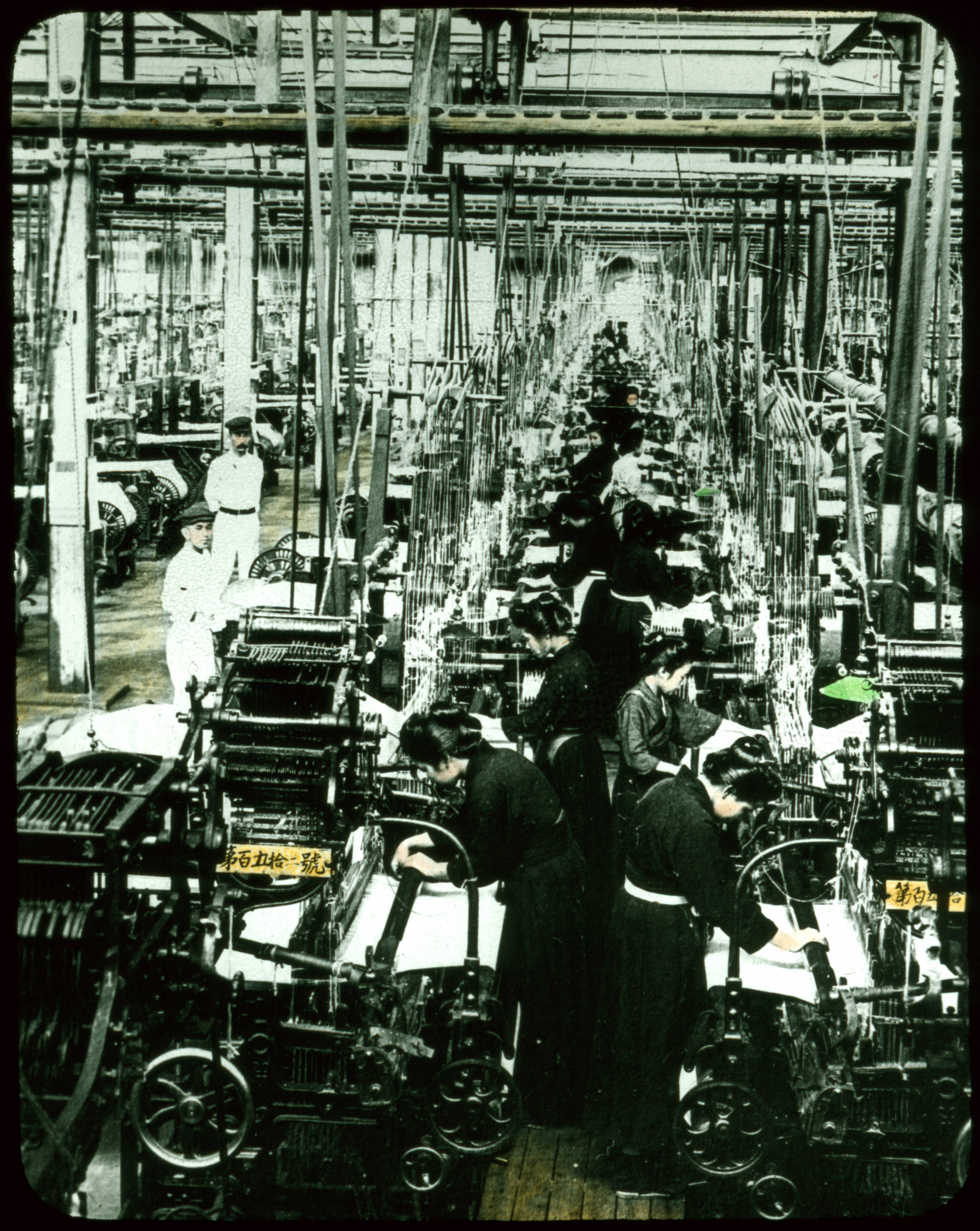
Machine-weaving in factory

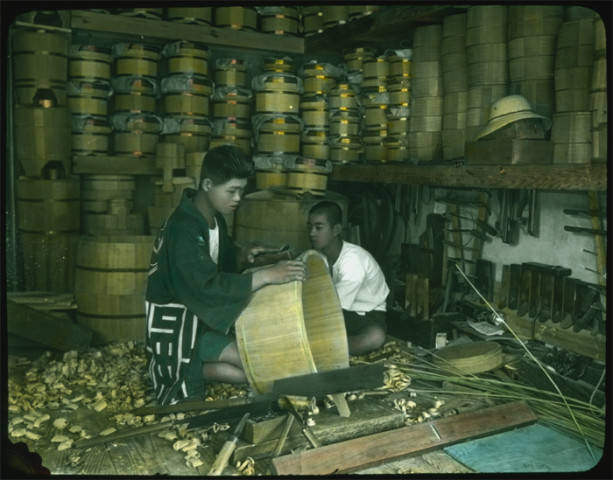
Making wooden barrels

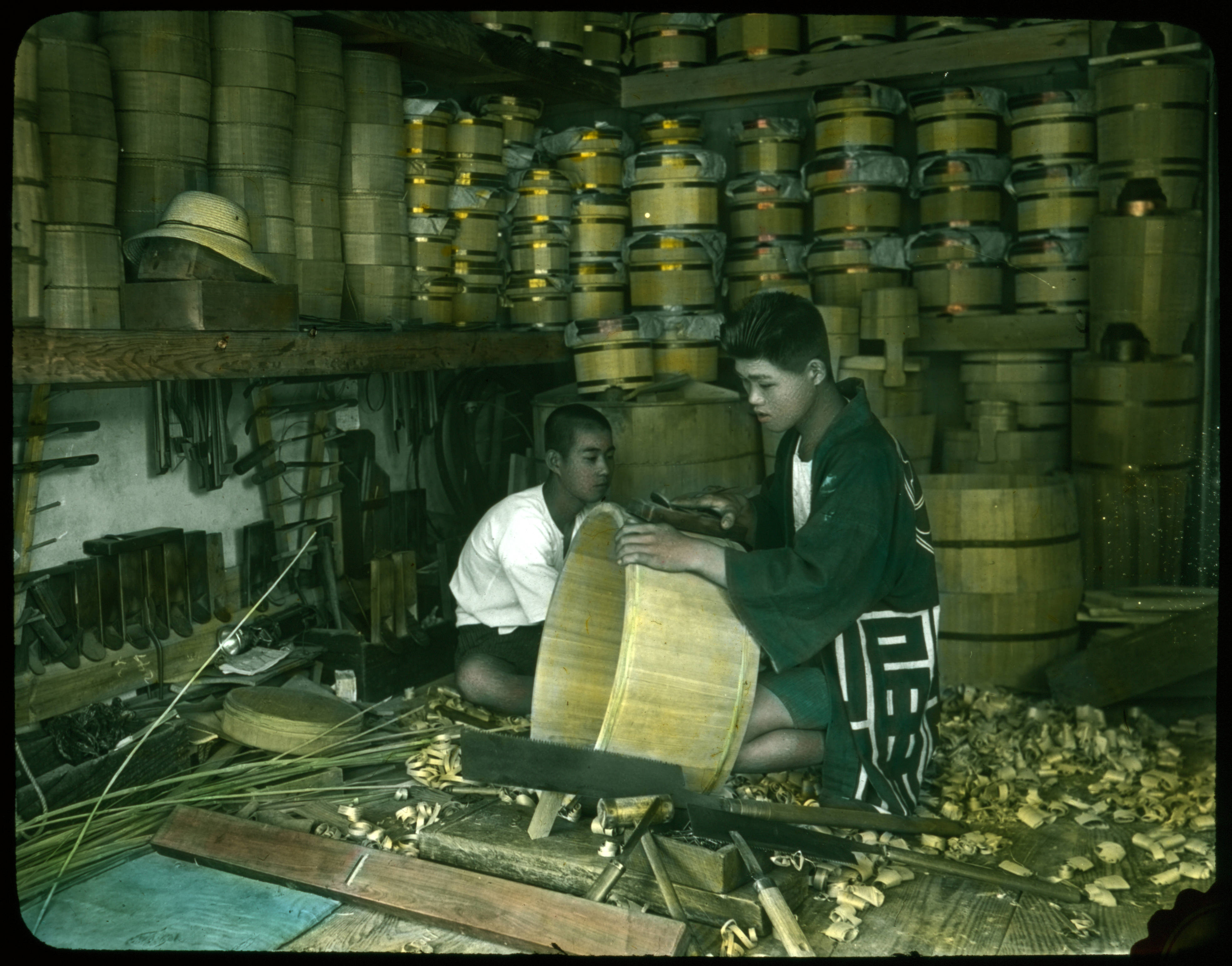
Making wooden barrels

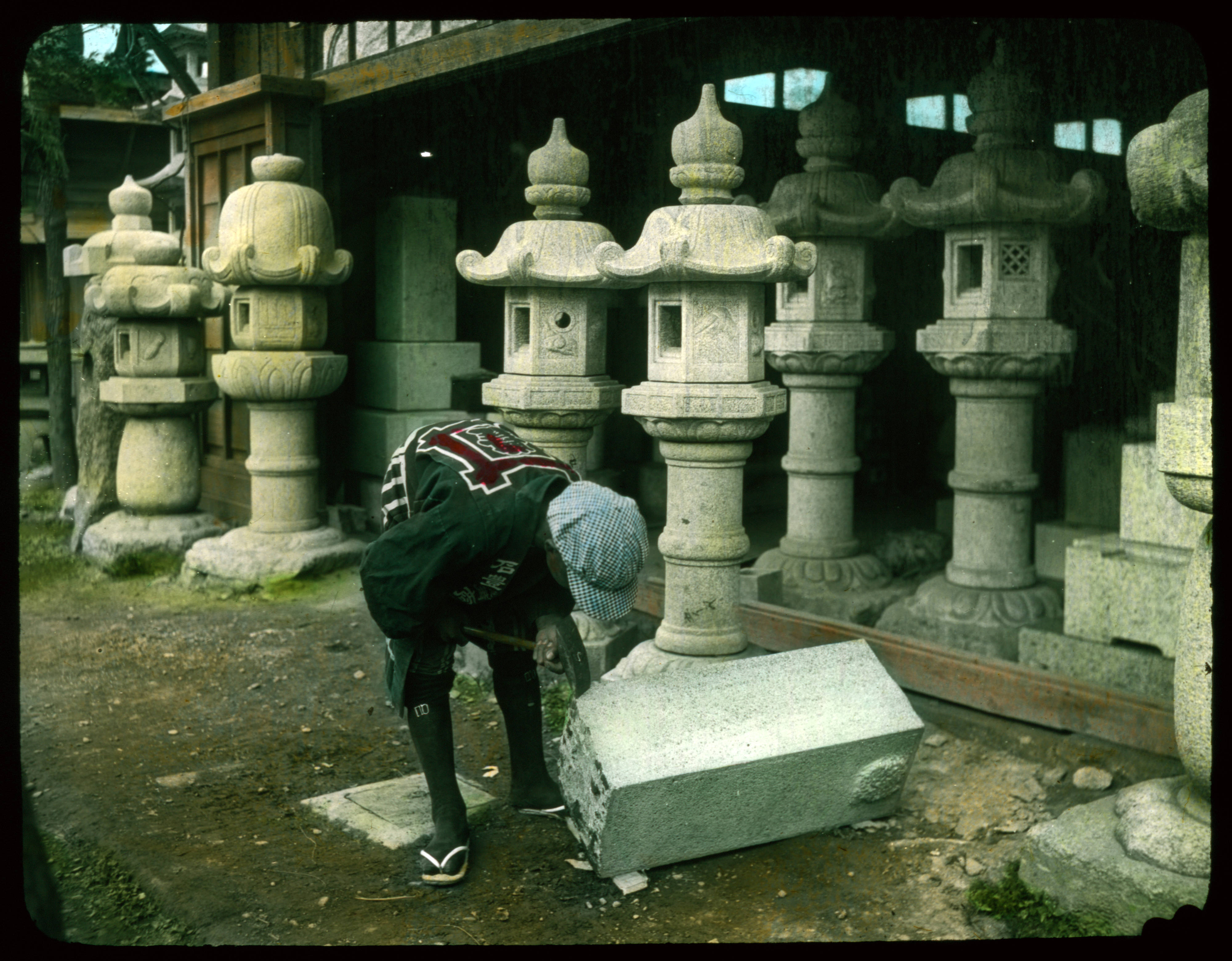
Man beginning to carve lantern from block of stone

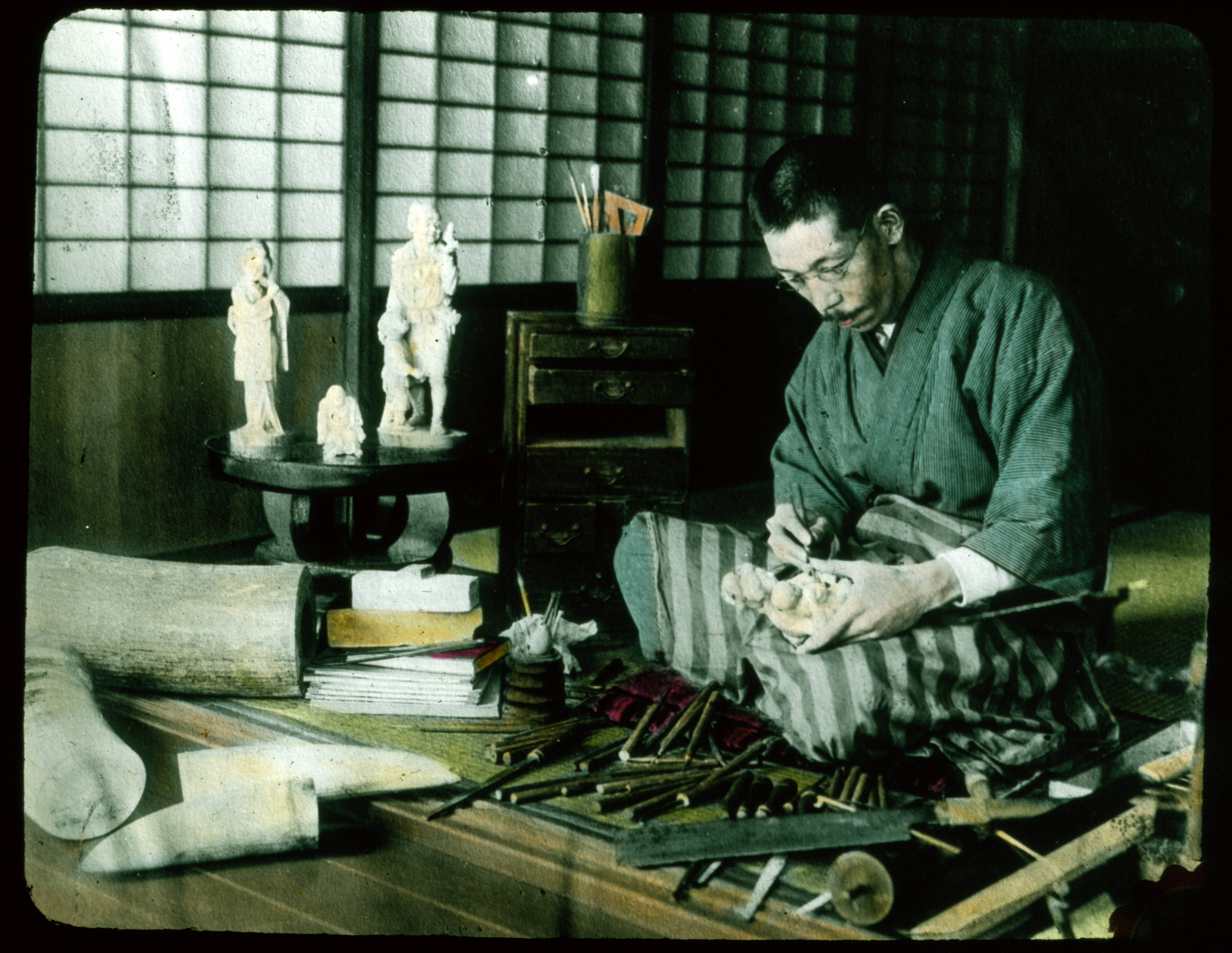
Man carving ivory statue of mother and child

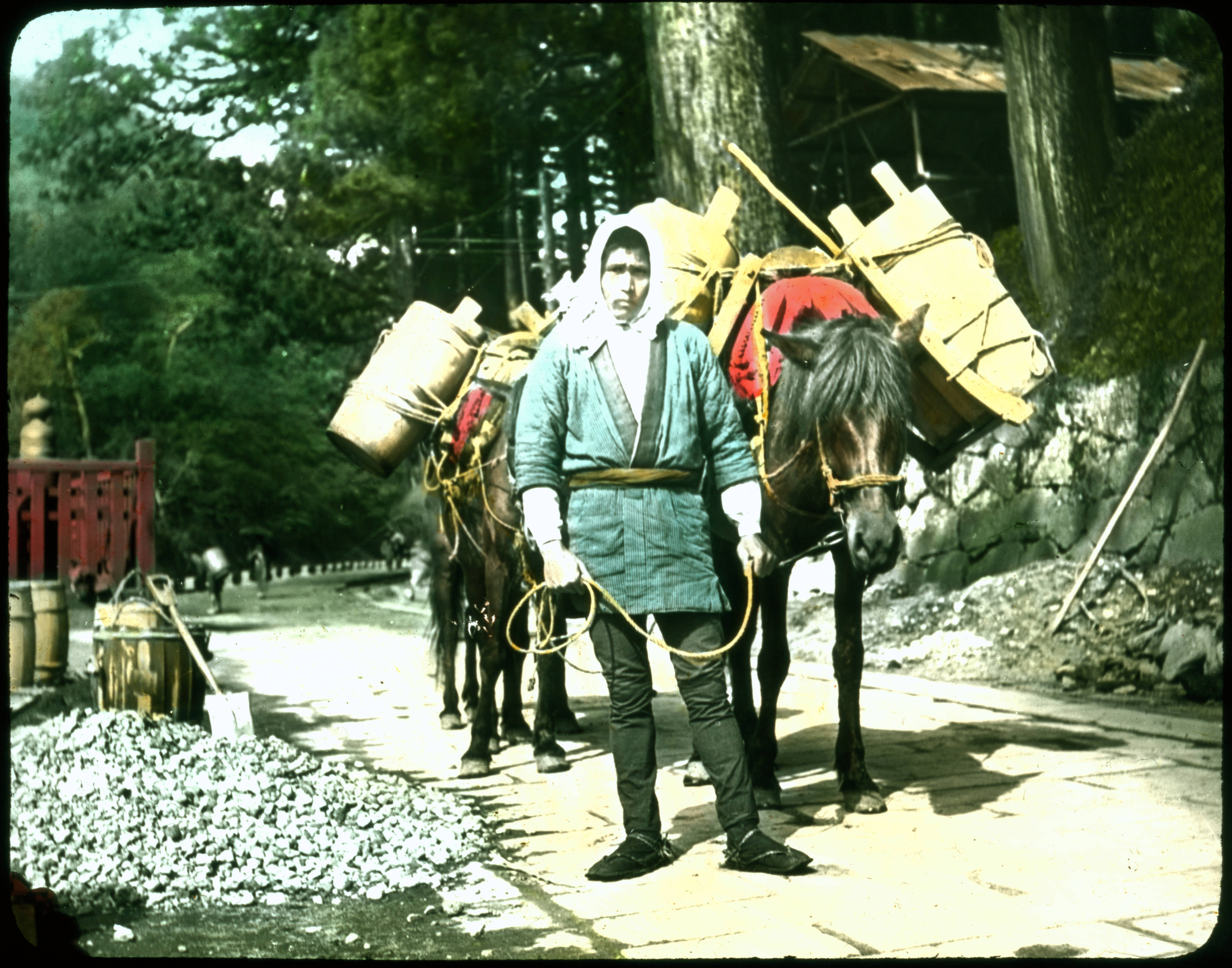
Man in local attire with loaded packhorses

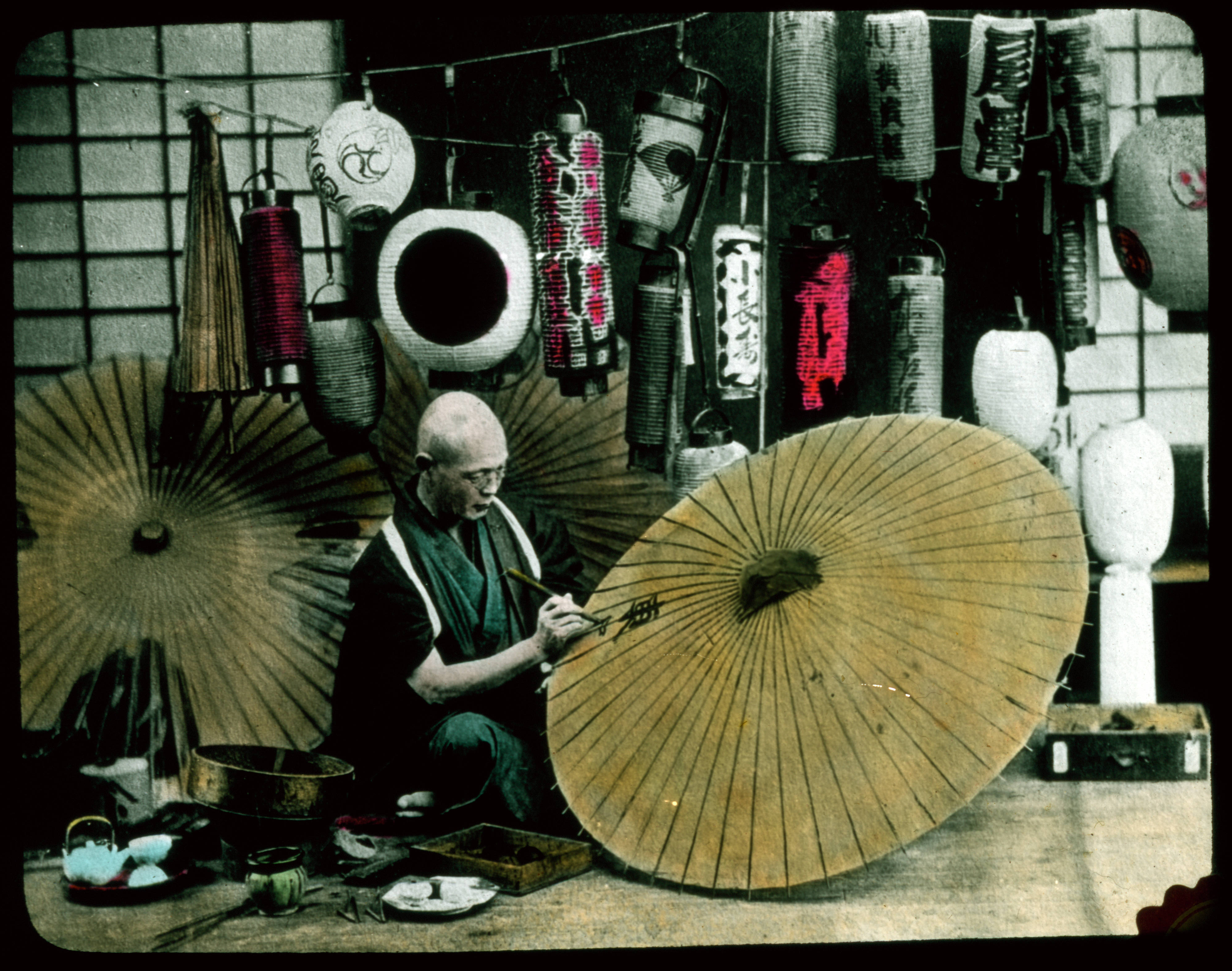
Man painting parasols; painted lanterns in background

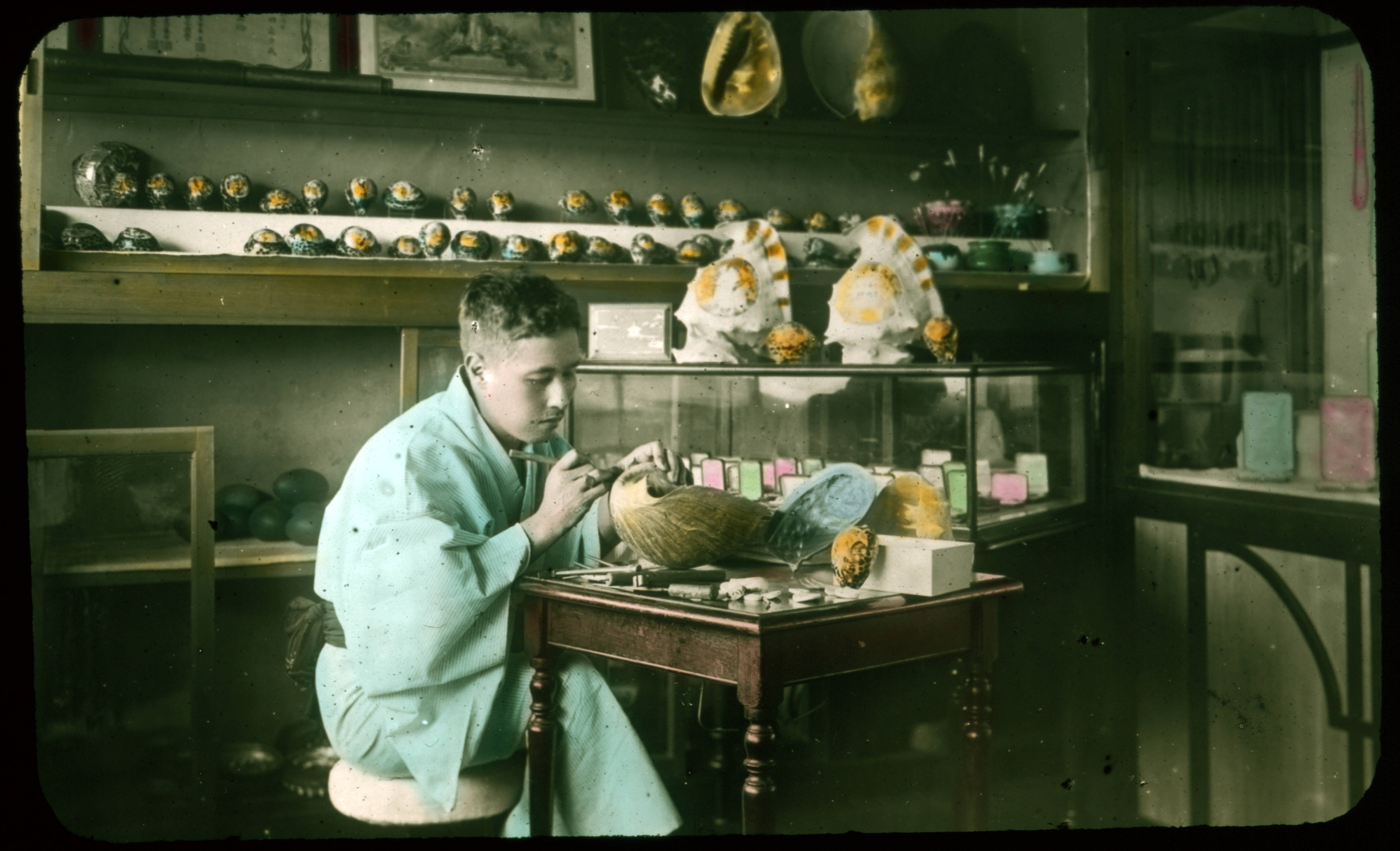
Man painting shells

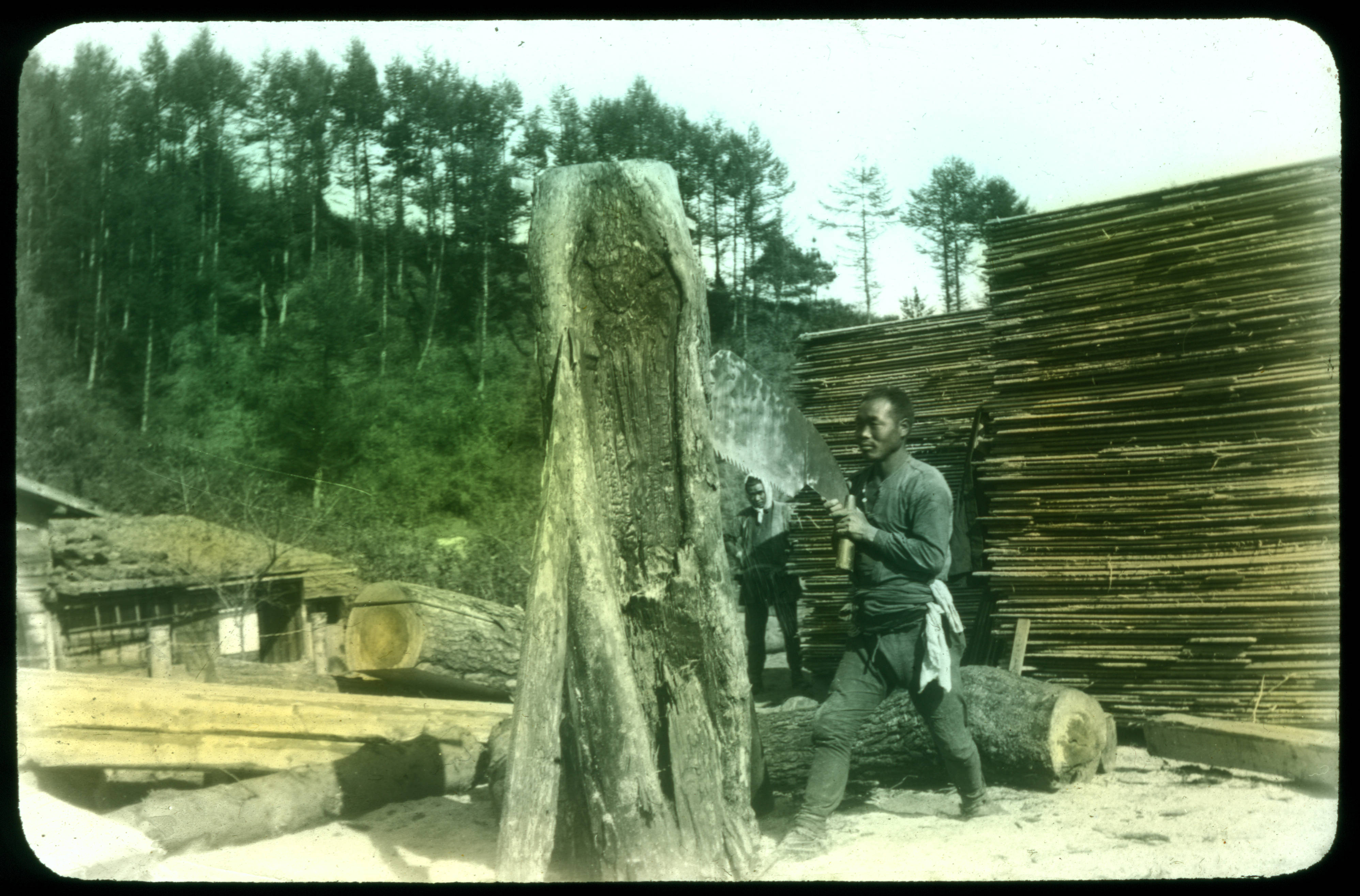
Man using handsaw on tree trunk

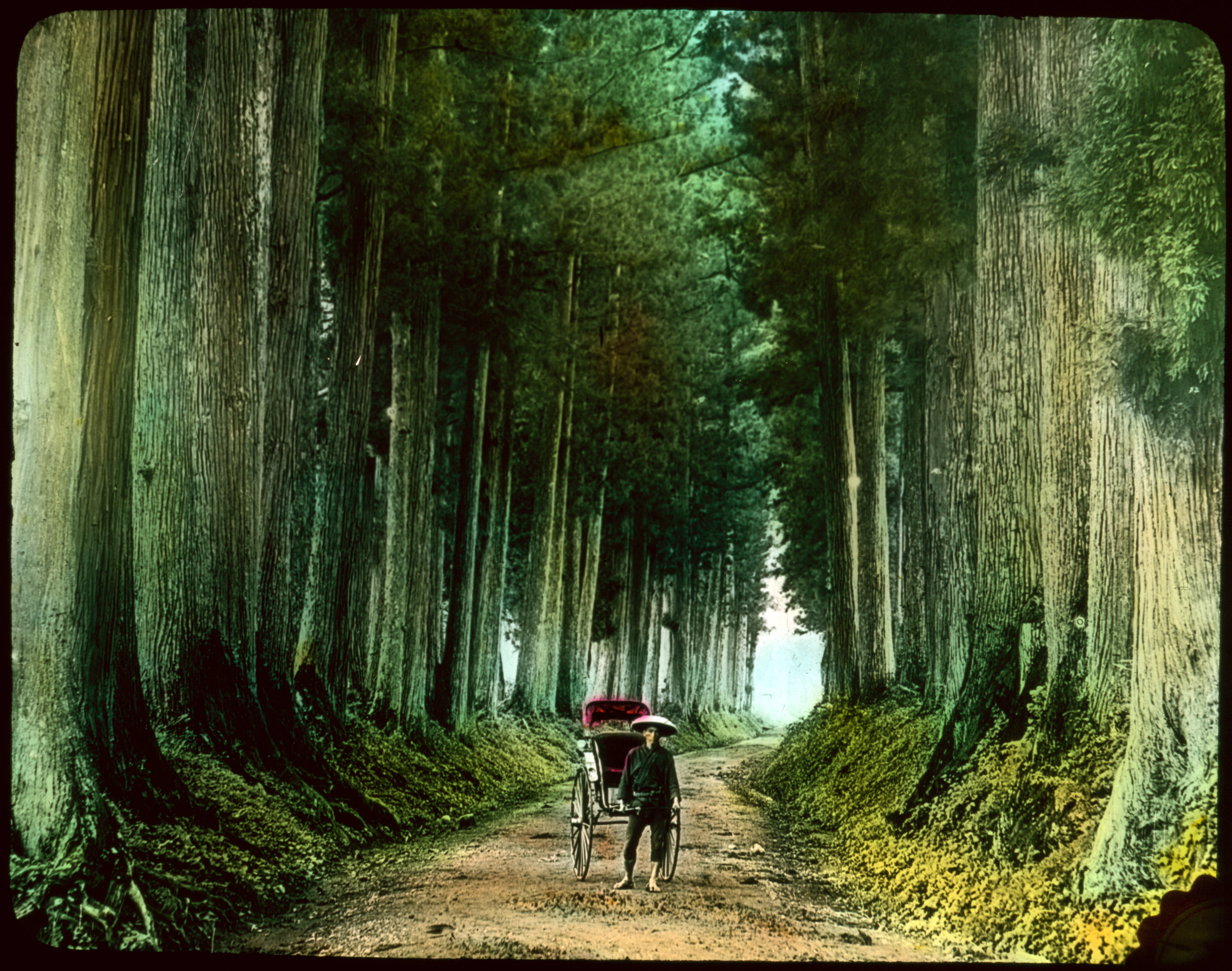
Man with rickshaw on tall tree lined dirt road

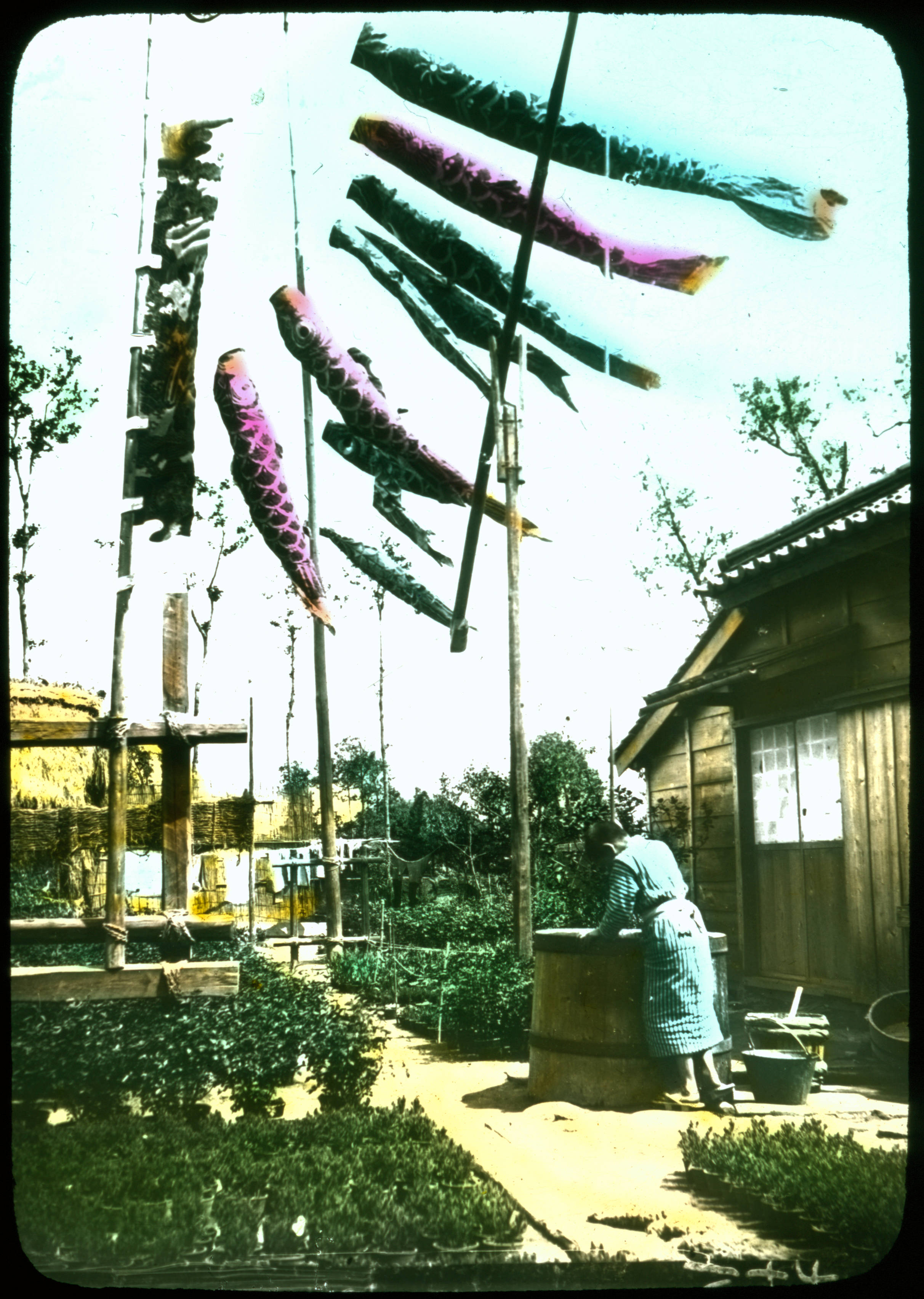
Man working over large wooden tub; rows of plants in pots all around; fish streamers flying overhead

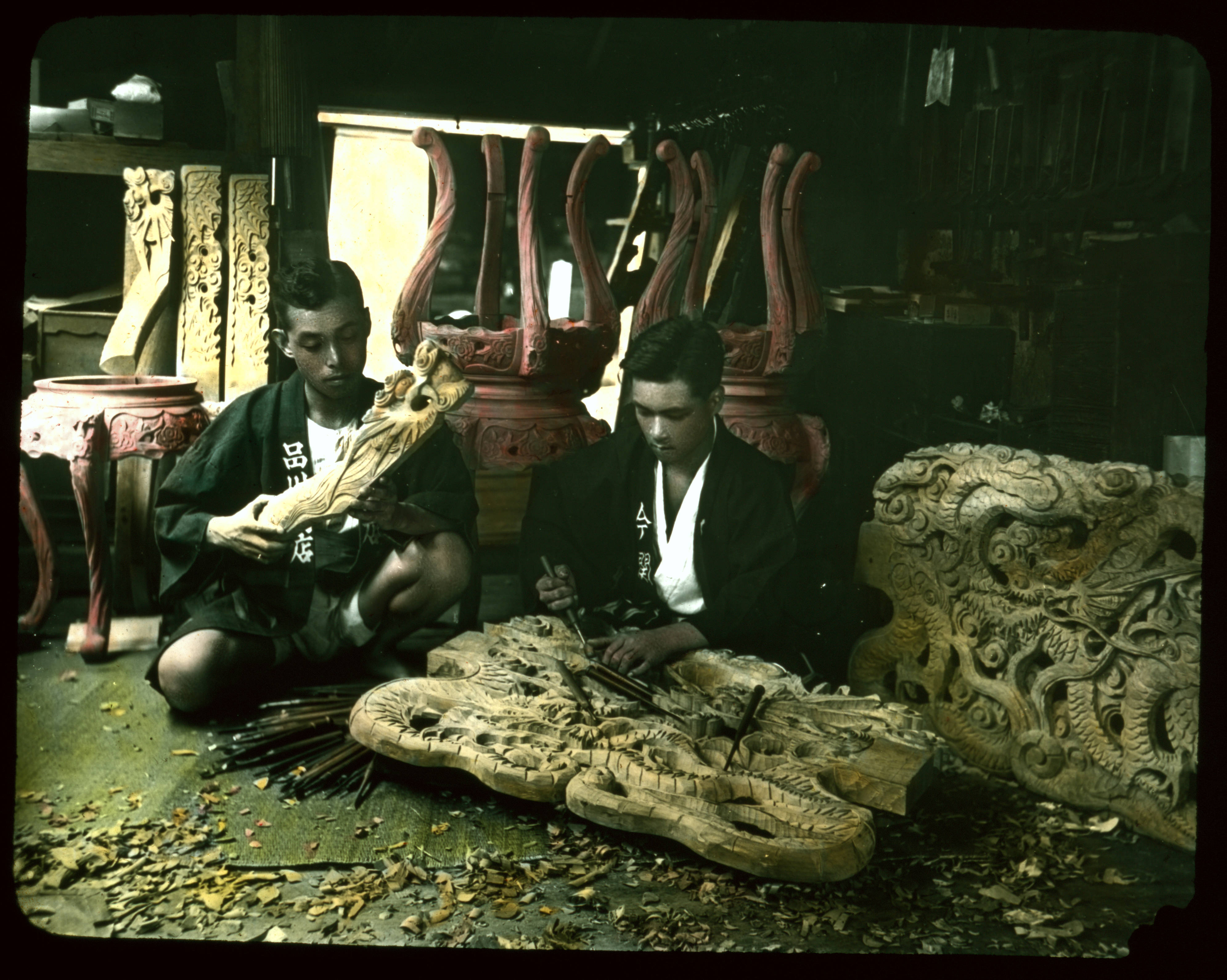
Men carving wooden furniture of intricate design

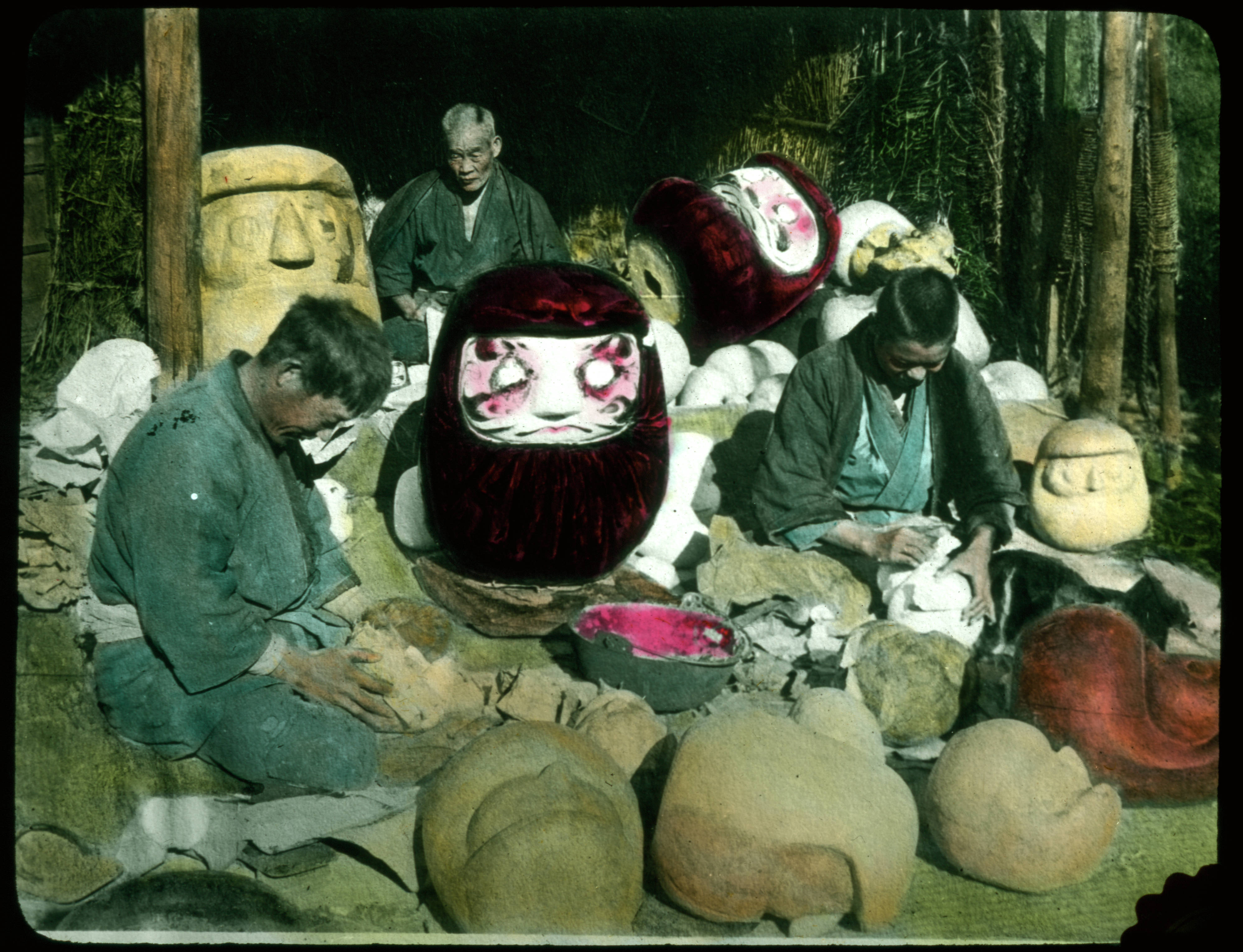
Men making clay moulds for giant masks

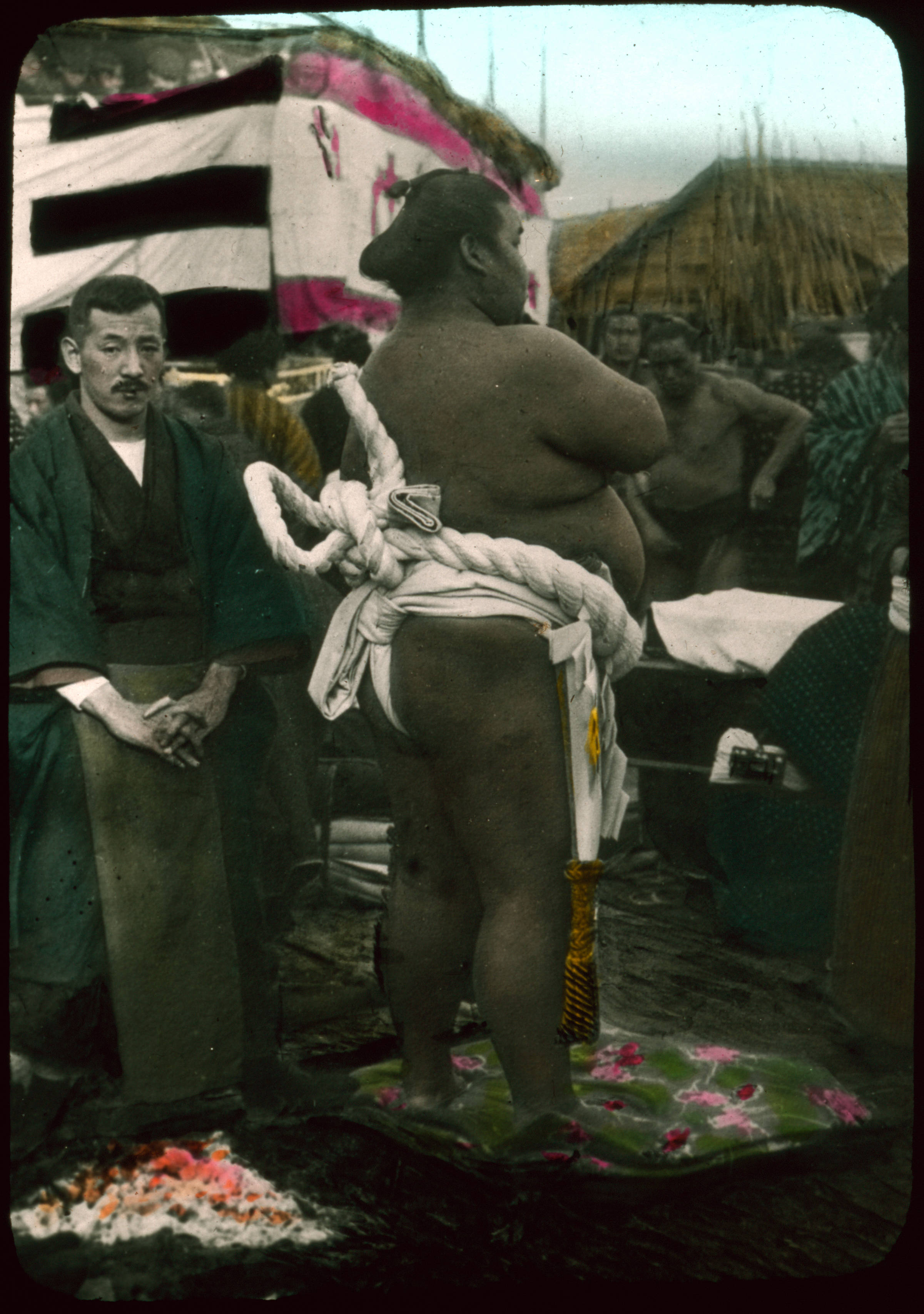
Men preparing for sumo wrestling outdoors

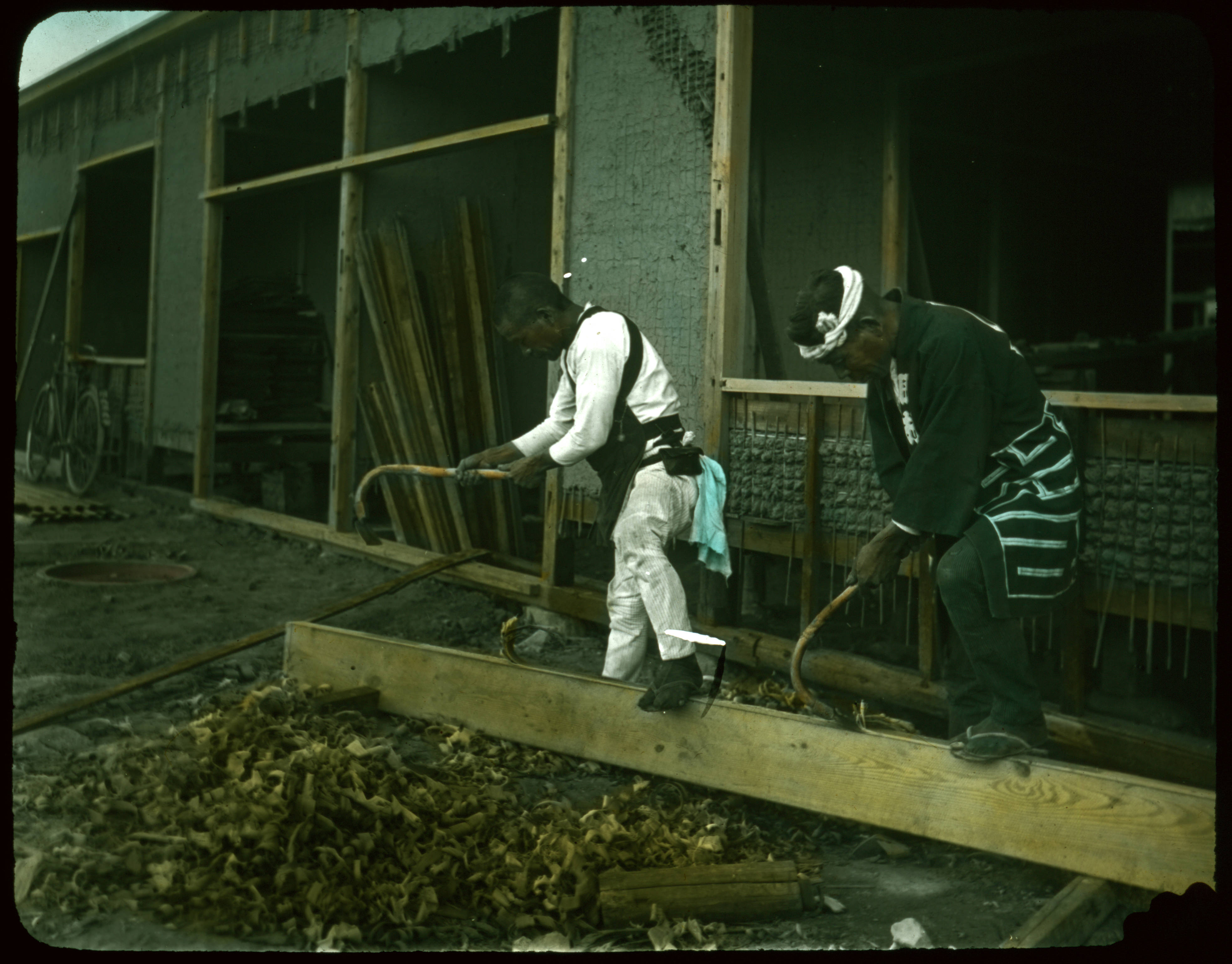
Men trimming edge of a plank

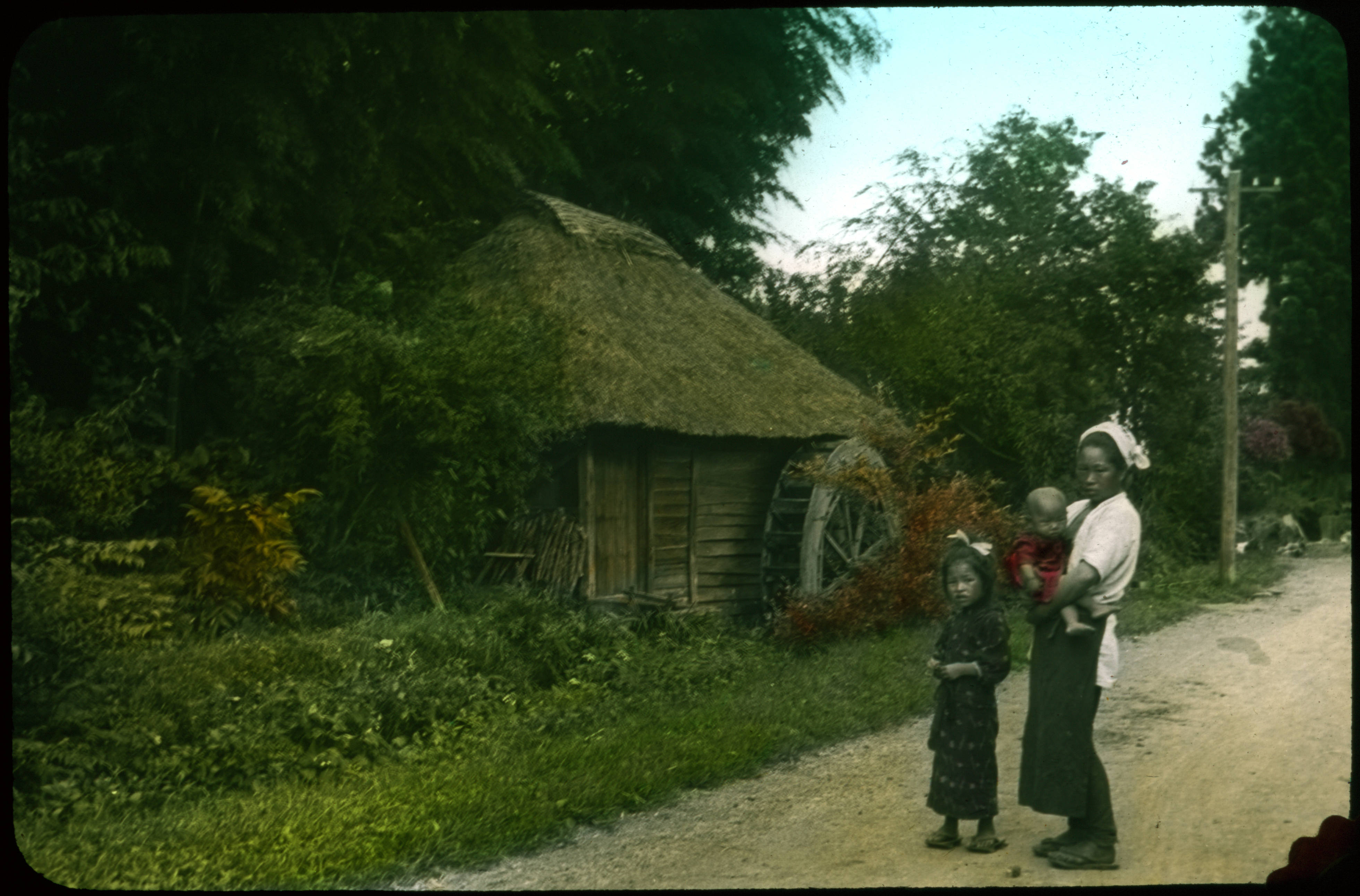
Mother and children outside rural hut with waterwheel

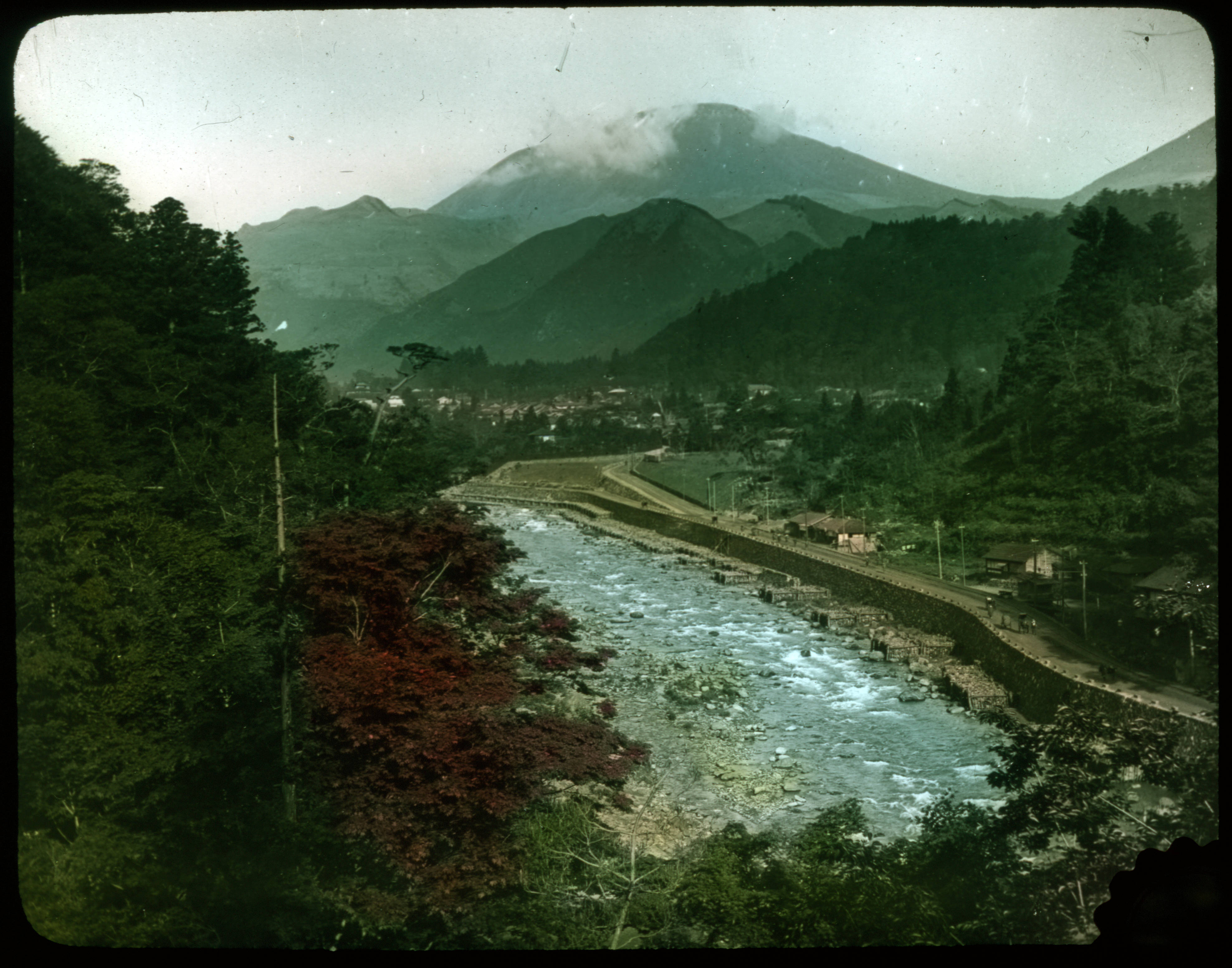
Mount Nantai and Daiya River

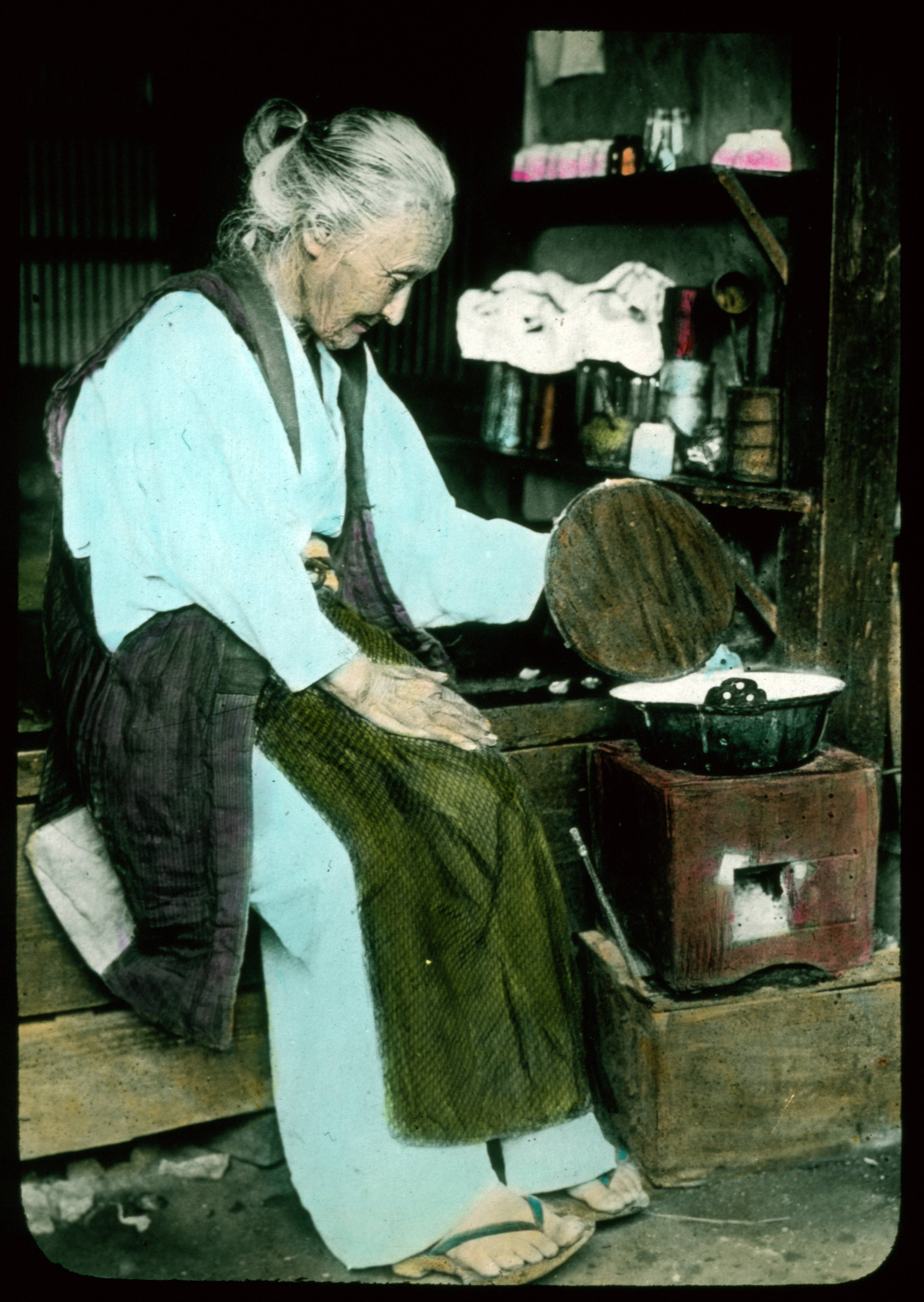
Old woman in shed heating substance in black pot

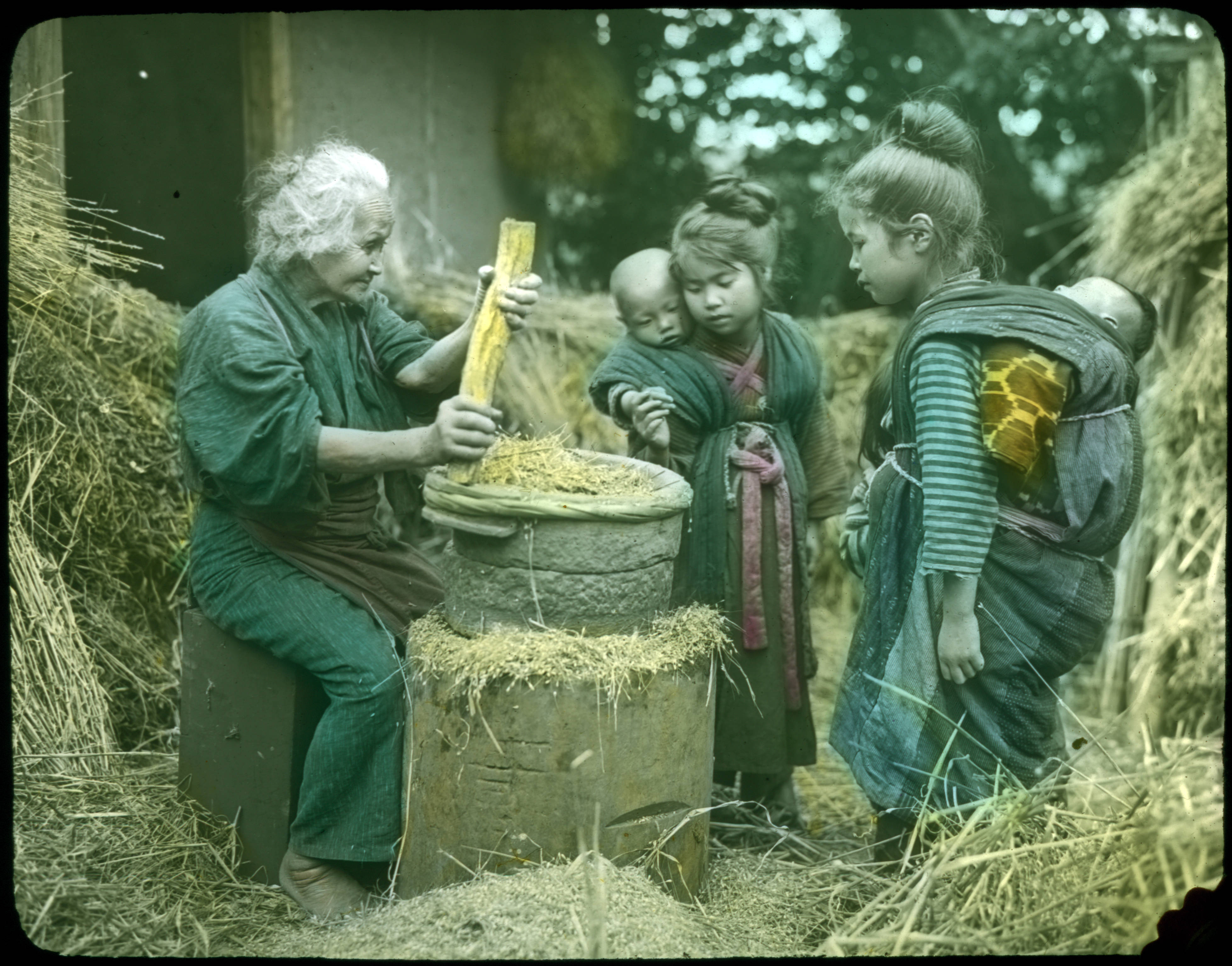
Old woman with raised grinding stone; two little girls carrying babies on their backs looking on

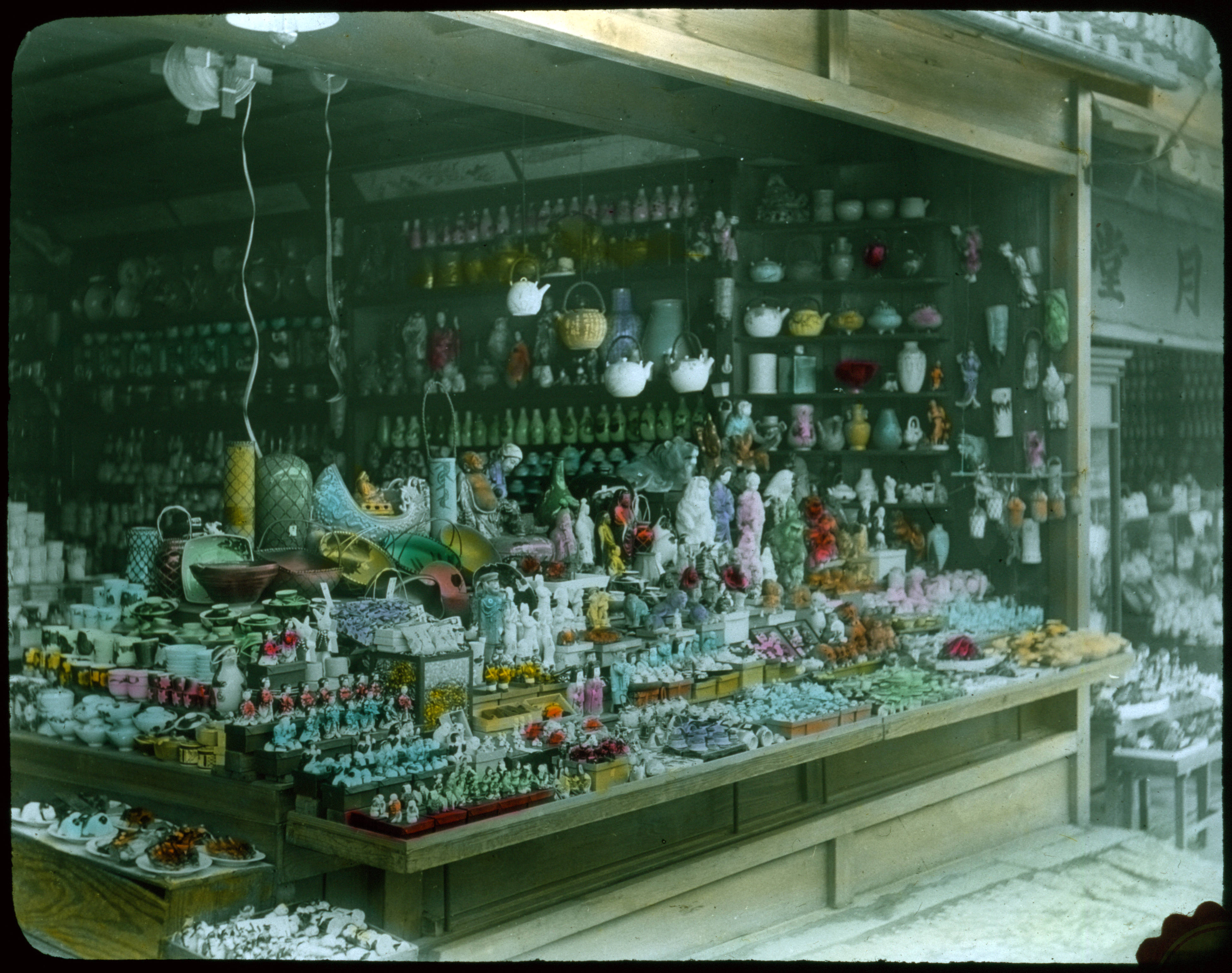
Open air ceramic shop

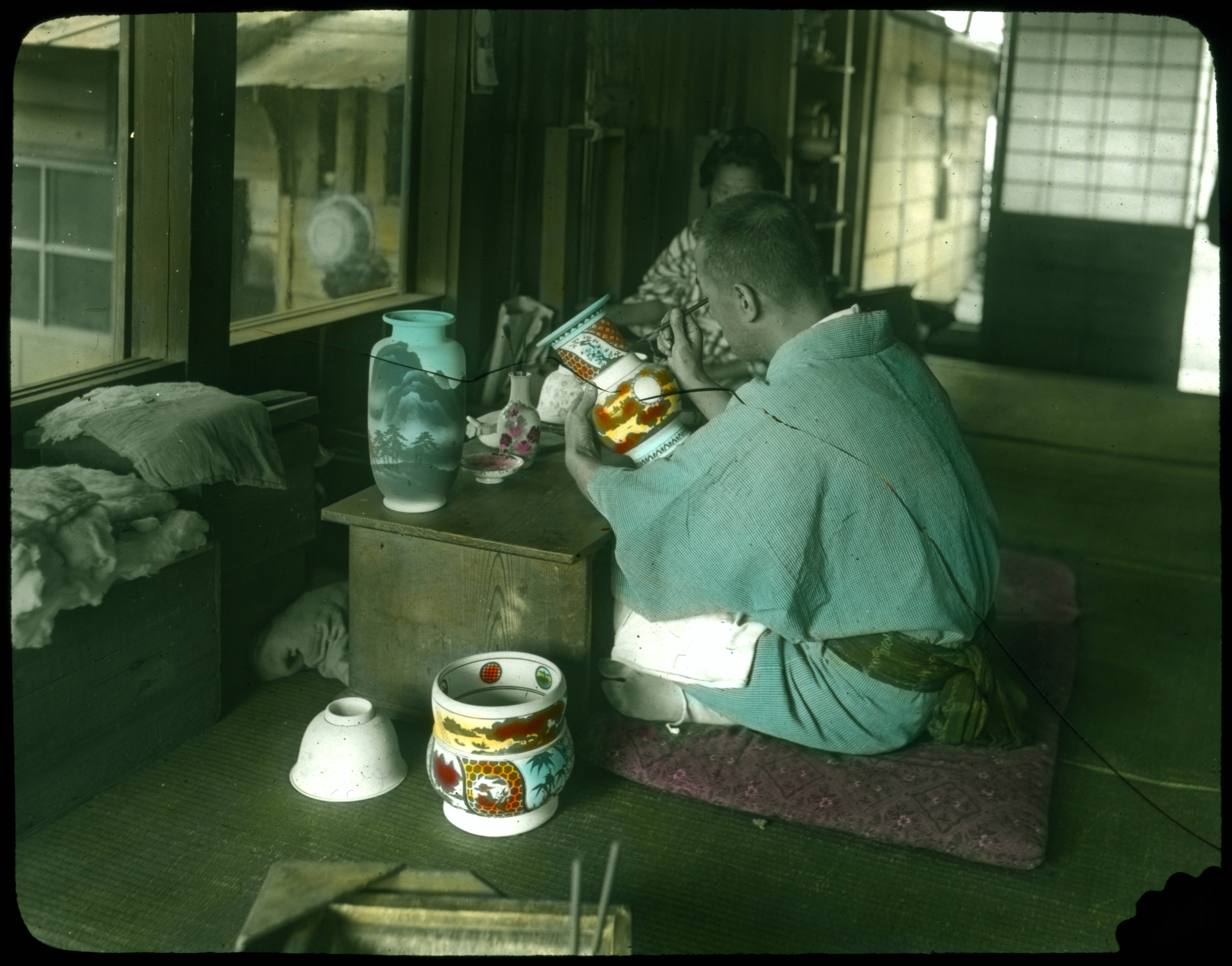
Painting vases. (slide cracked)

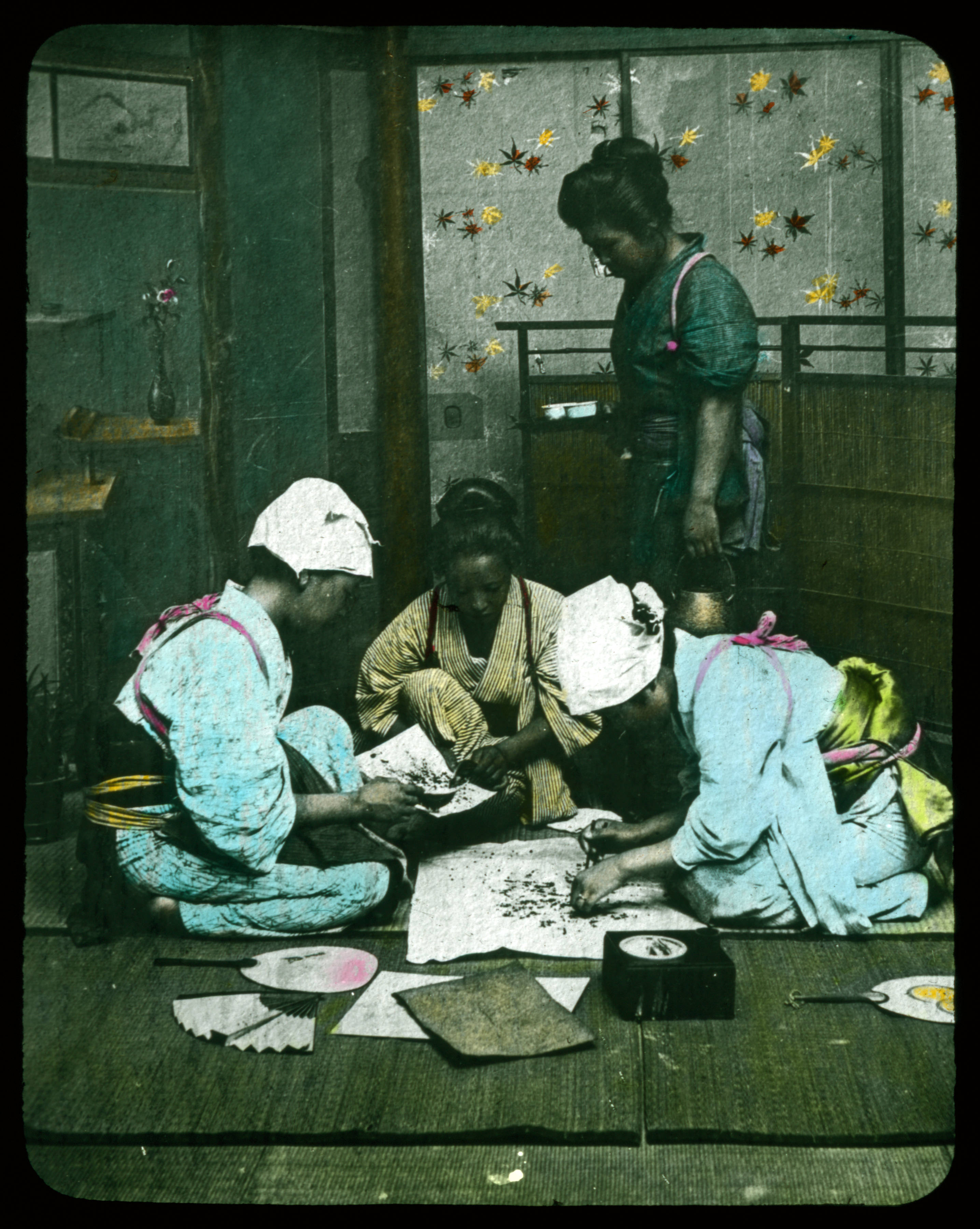
Papering Eggs for Next Year

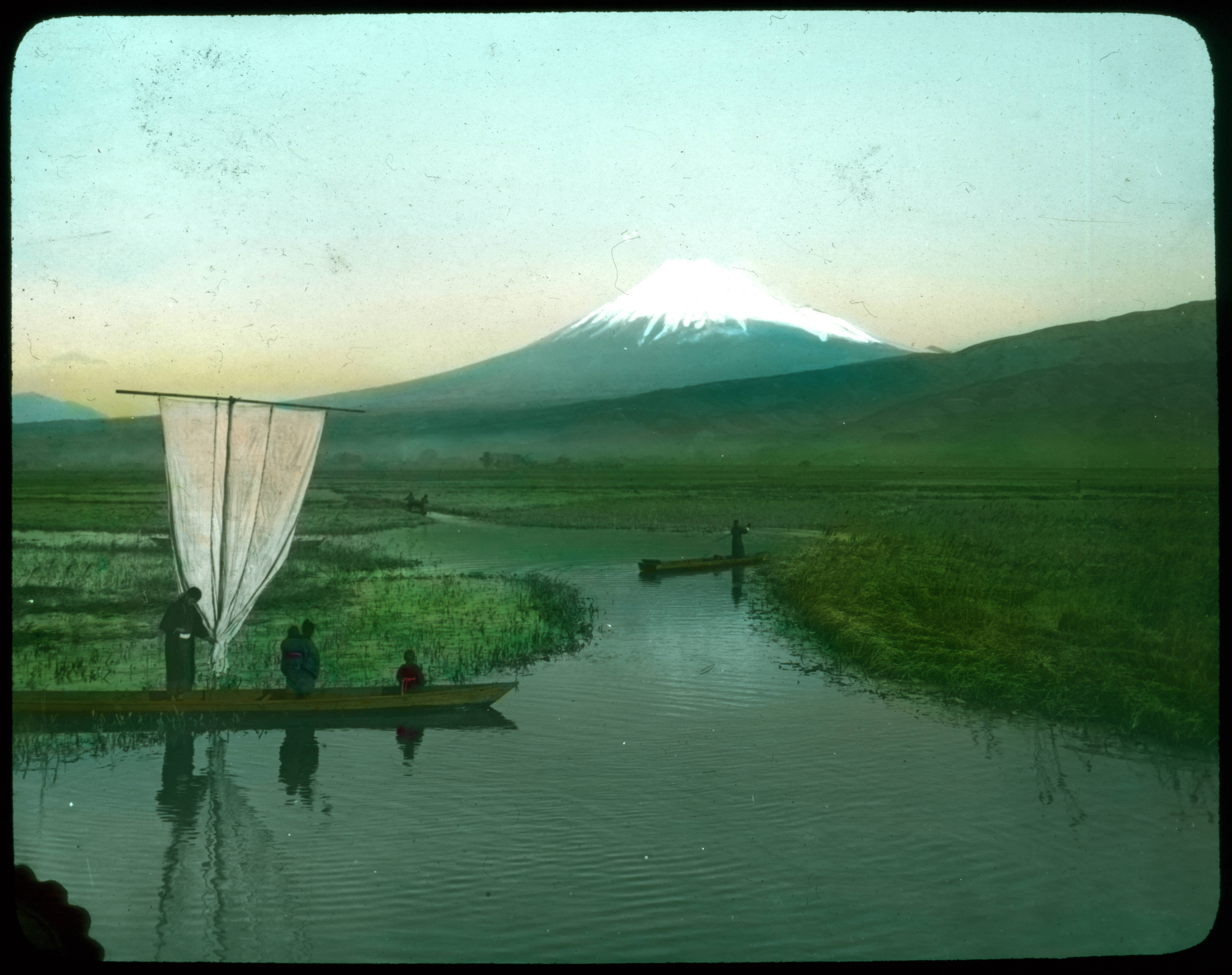
People in boats on waterways through rice fields; snow-covered mountain in background

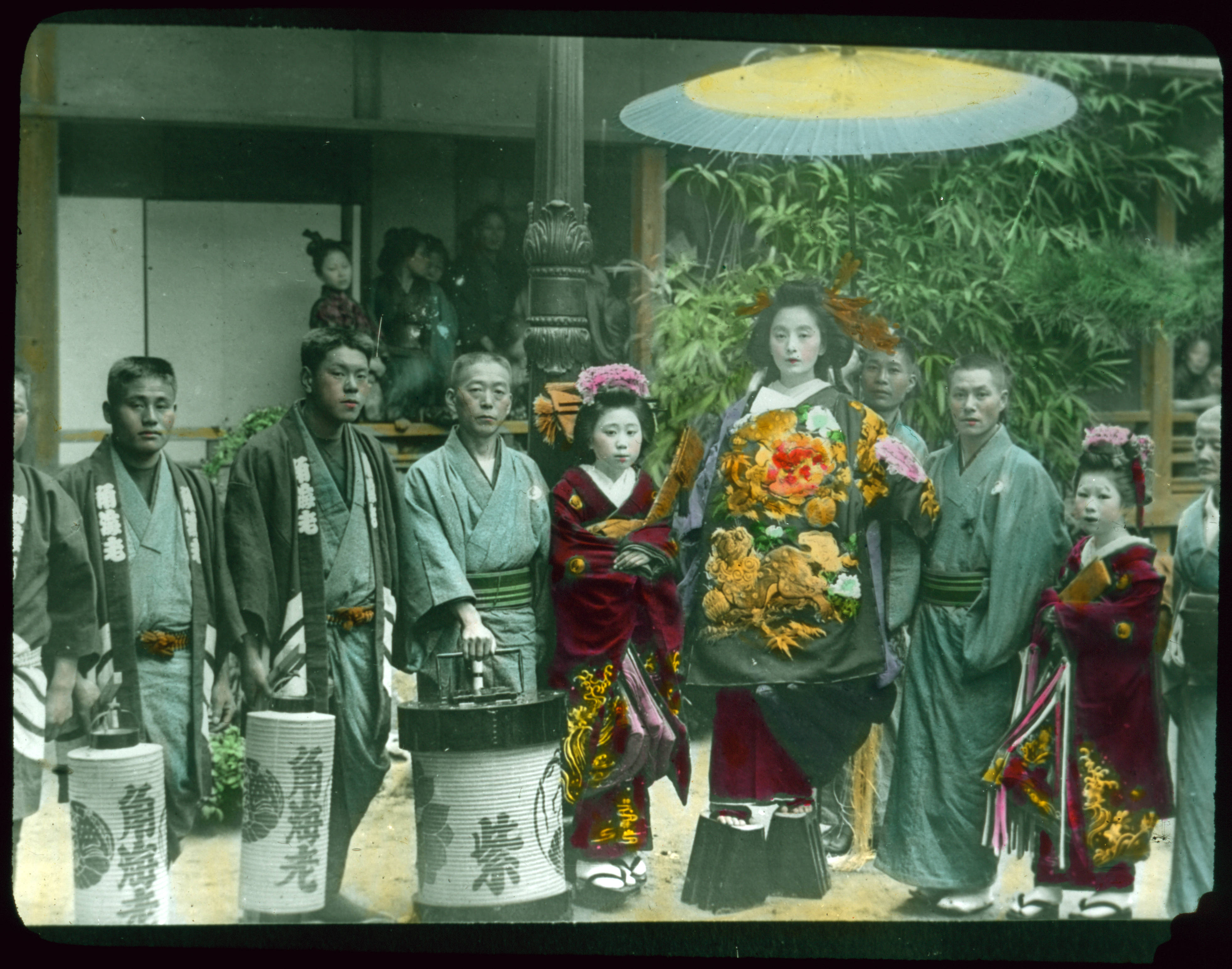
People in special attire, with lanterns, posing for photograph

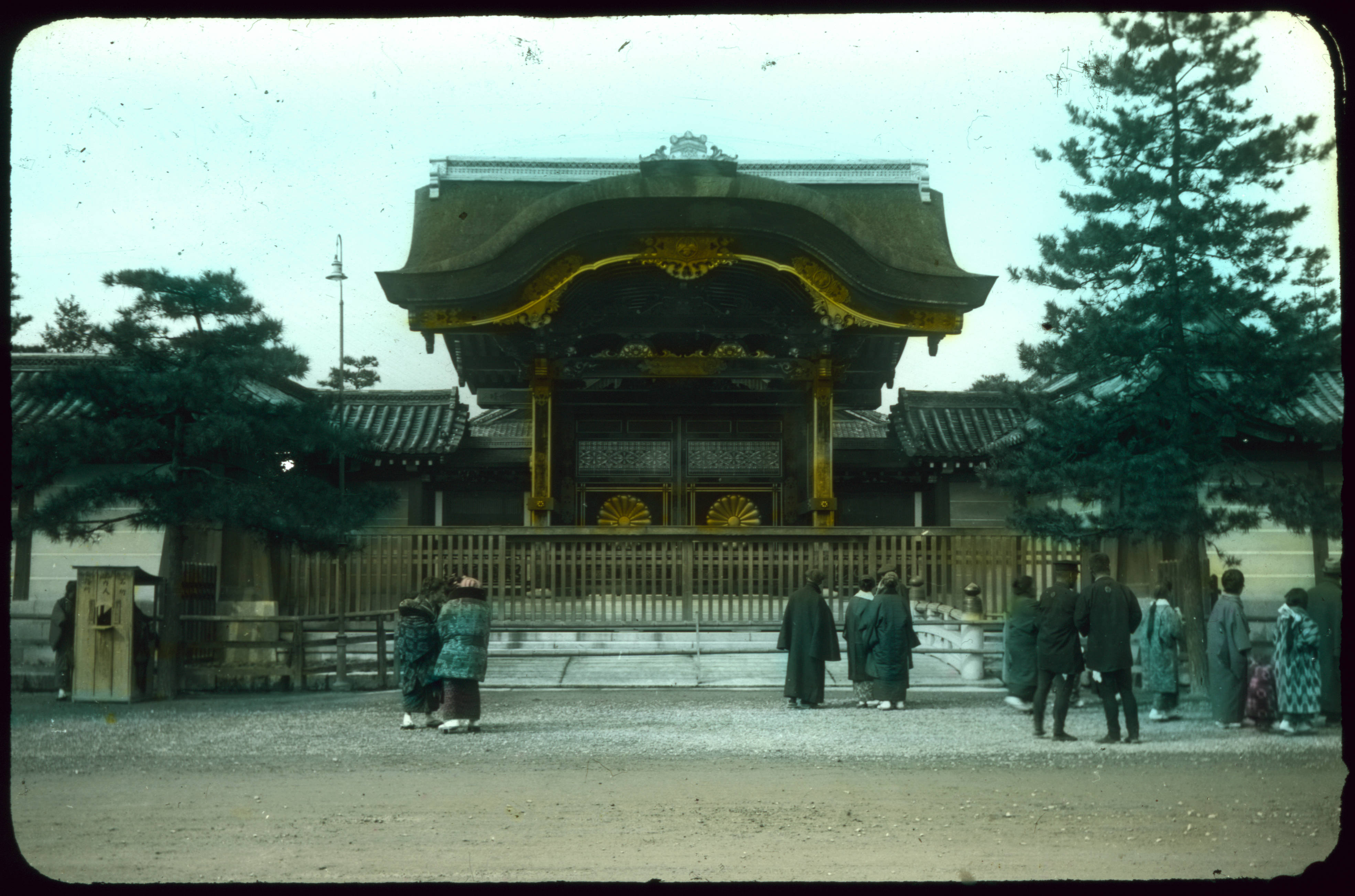
People in traditional attire and men in uniforms standing outside building with gilt trim

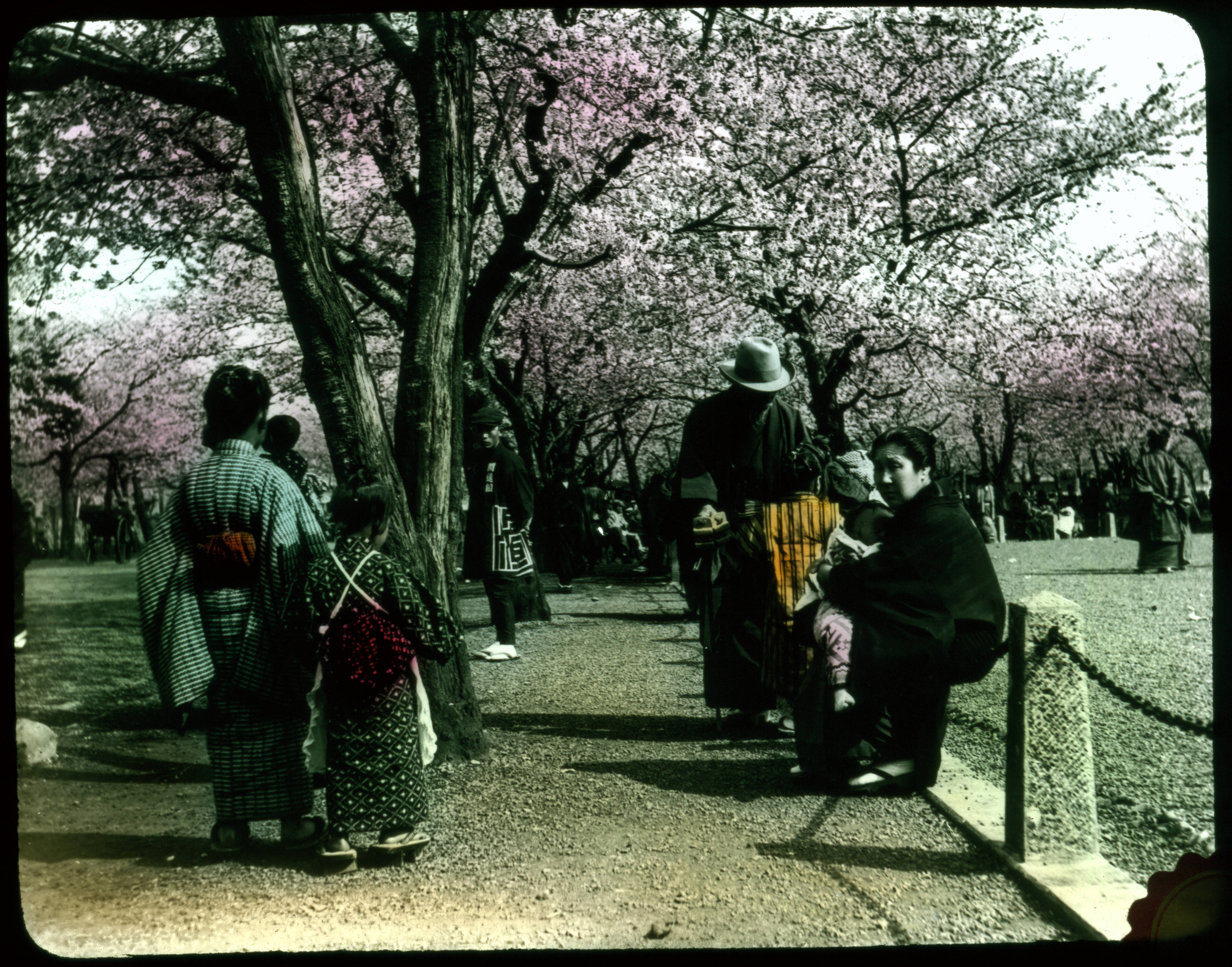
People in traditional attire in park

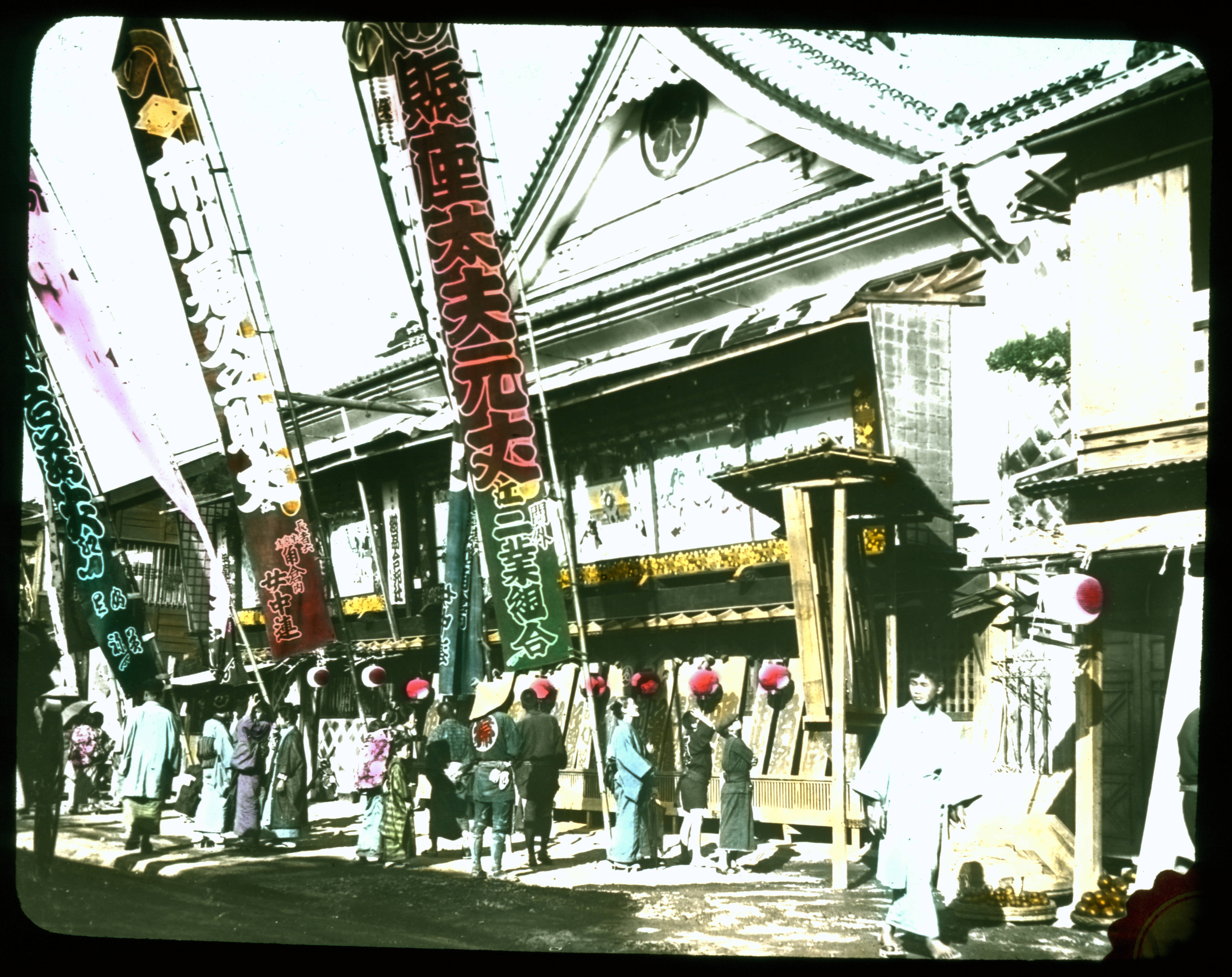
People on street in traditional dress outside building decorated with large banners, lanterns and signs

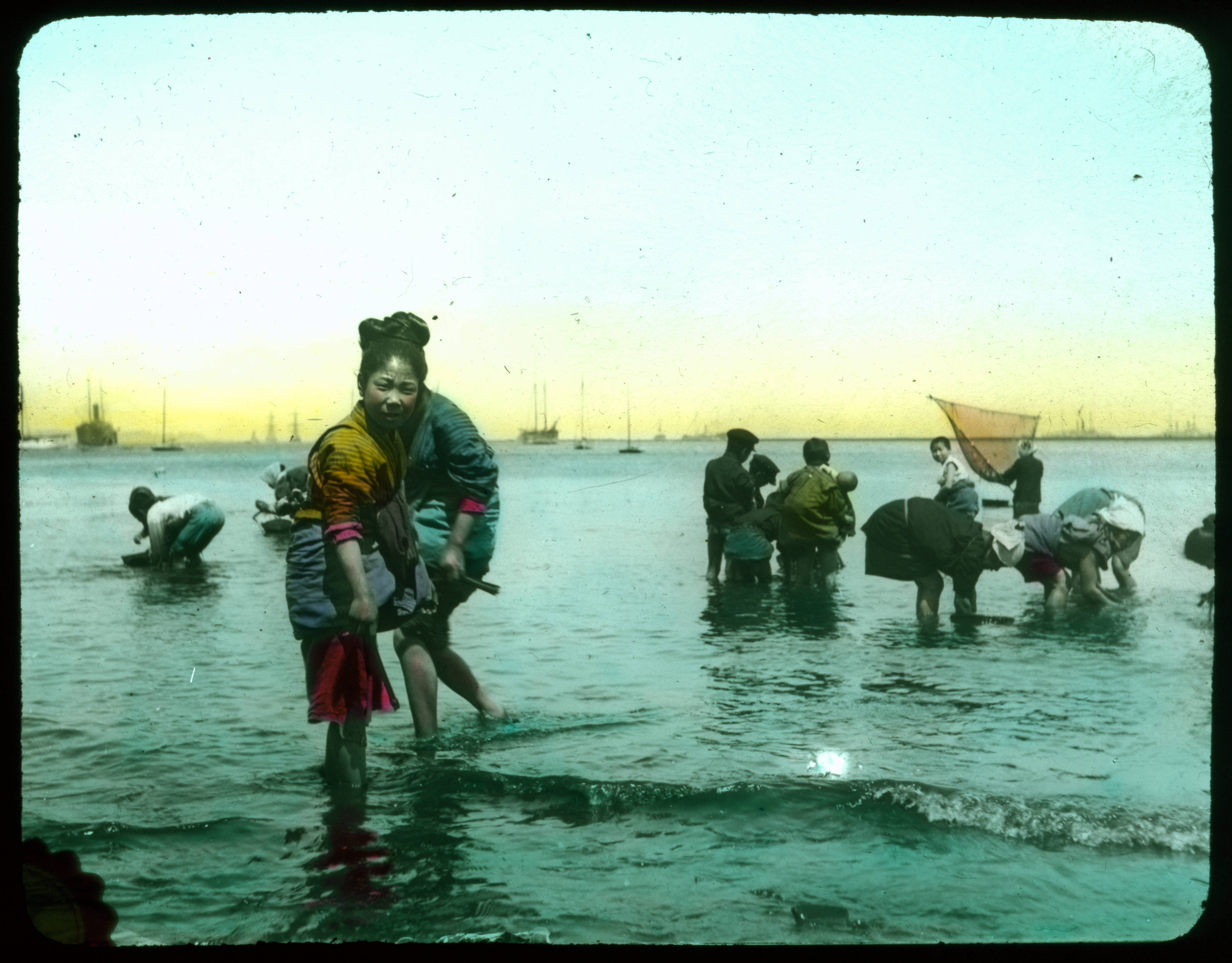
People wading in sea; fisher with hand net; boats in background

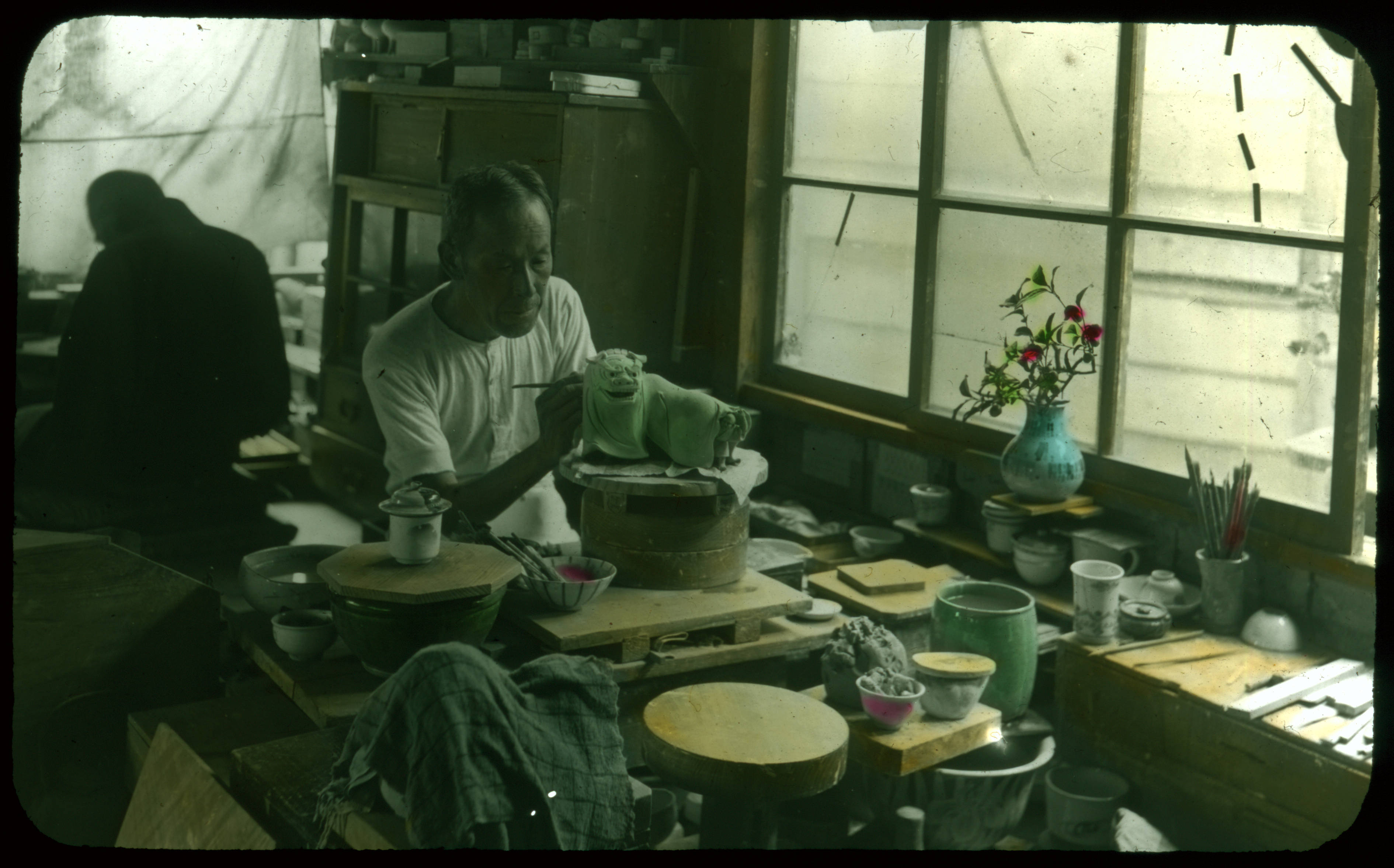
Potter at work on lion figure

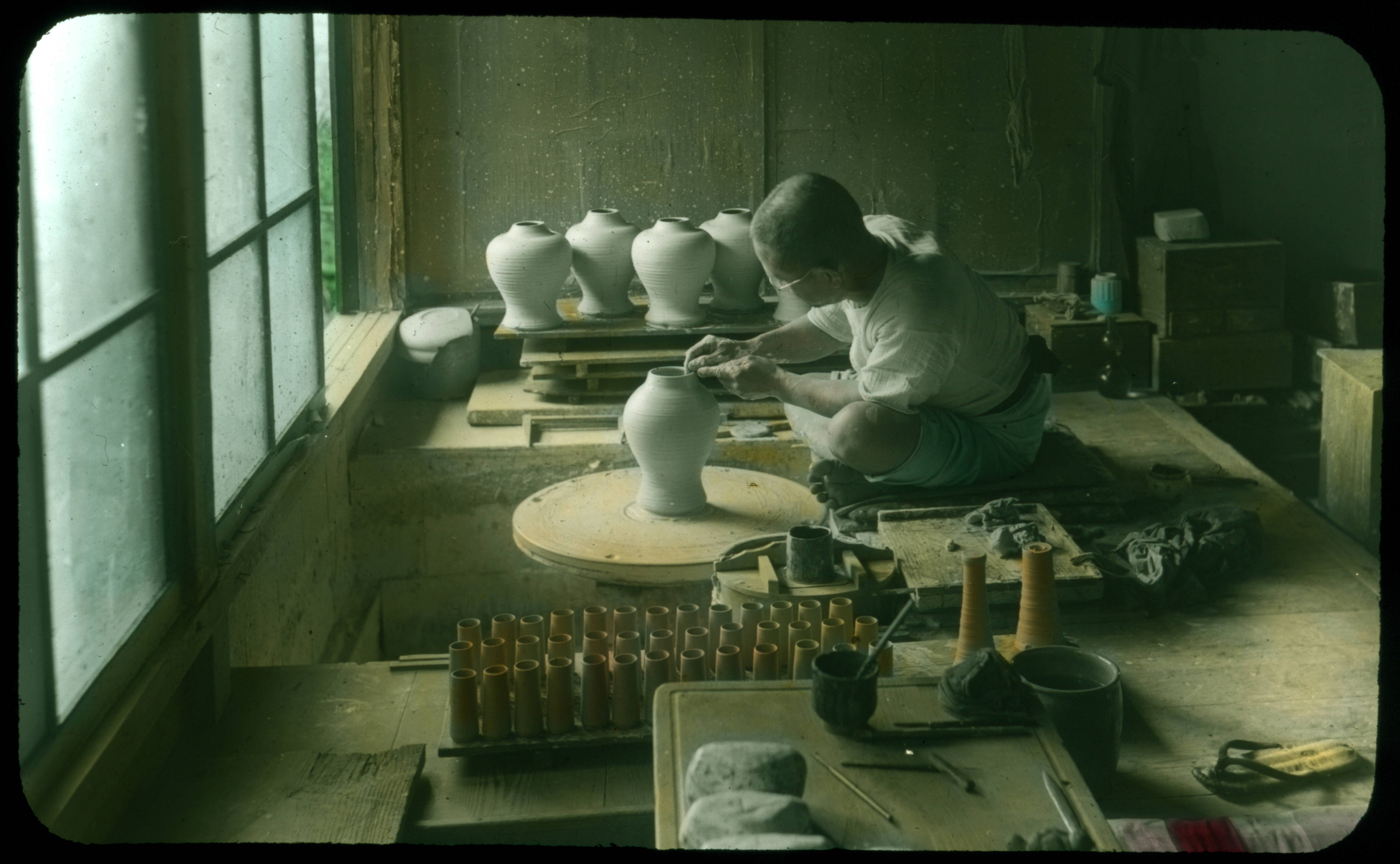
Potter making vase on wheel

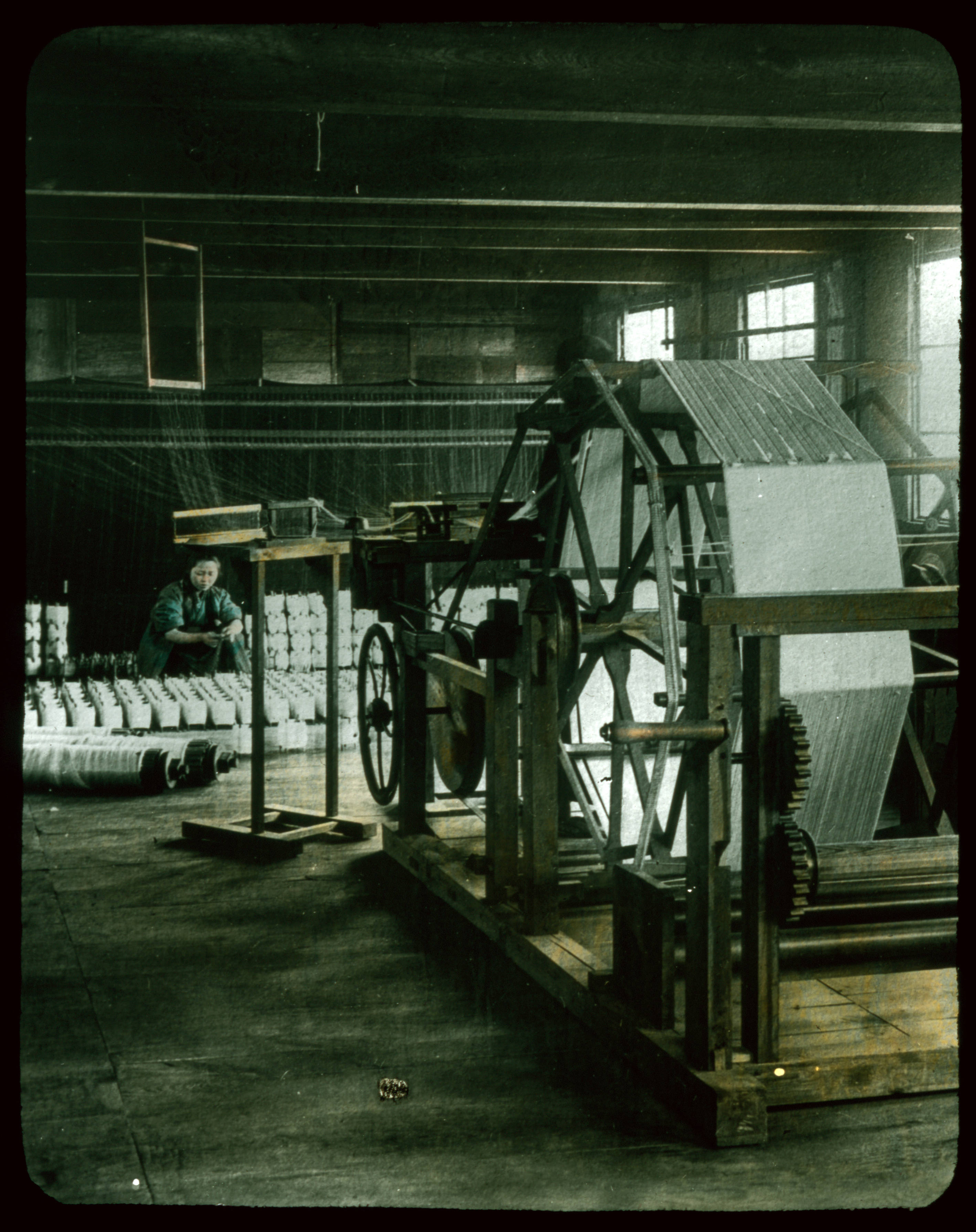
Reeling Silk in Large Skeins

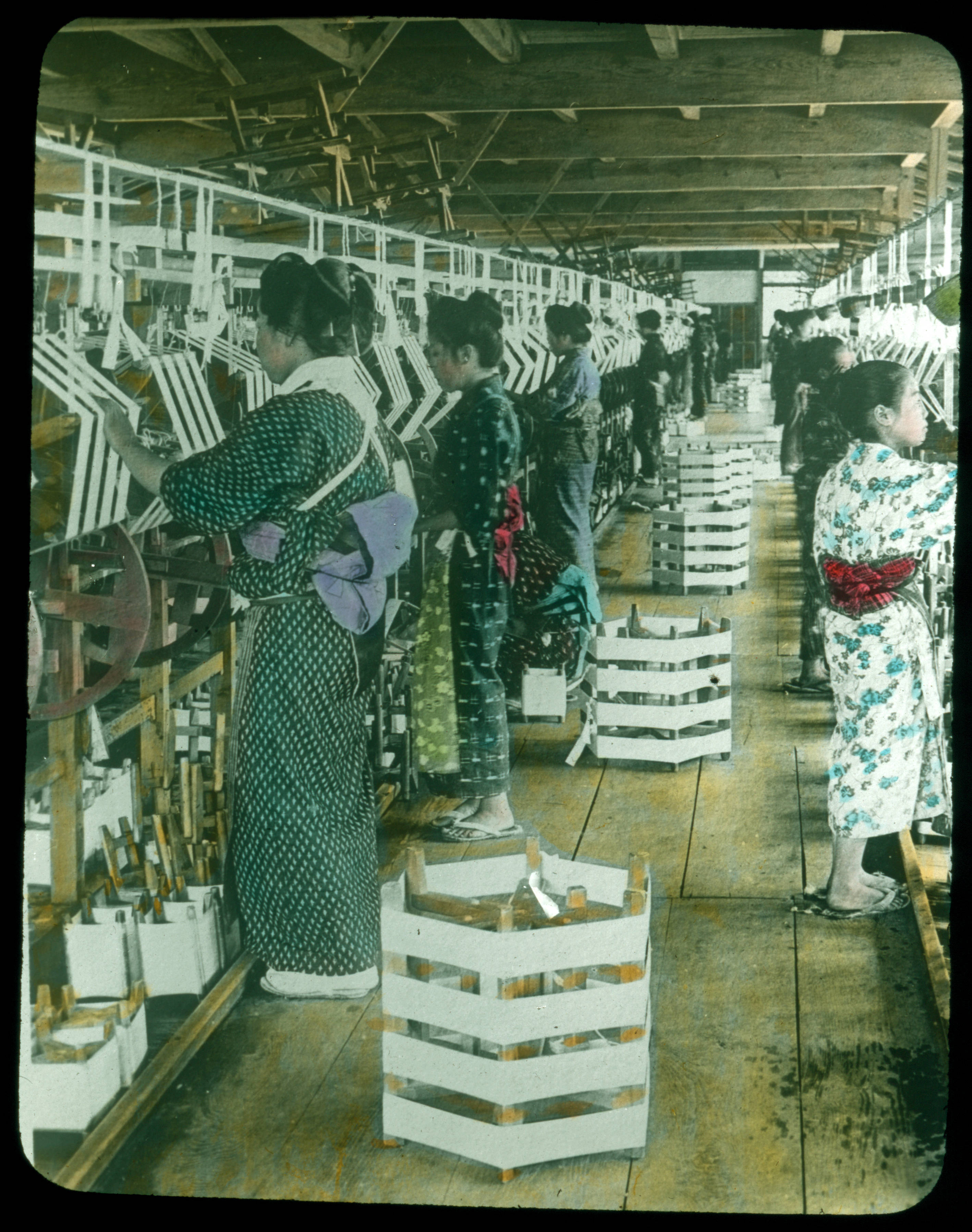
Reeling Silk in Small Skeins

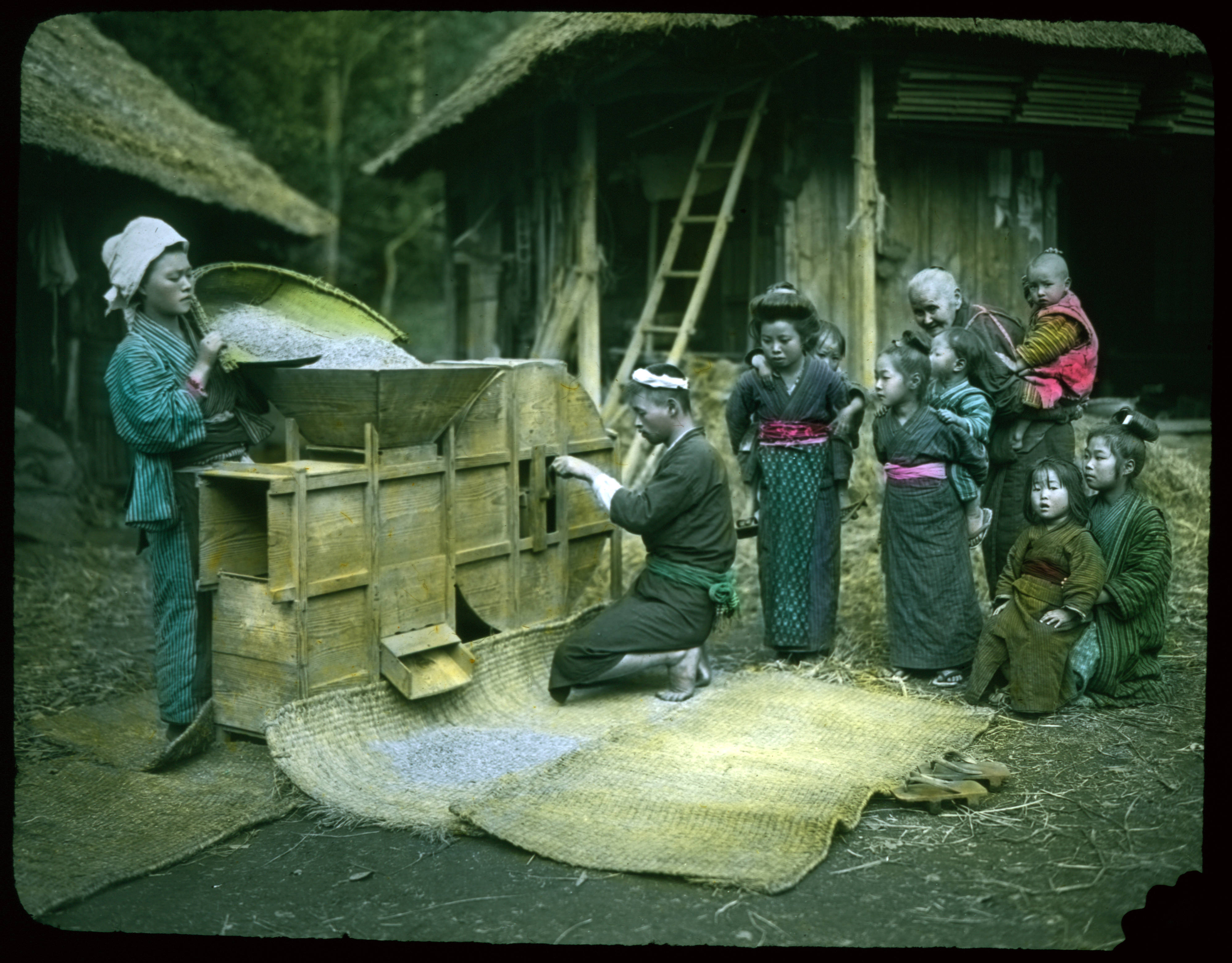
Rice being poured into a wooden mechanical hopper

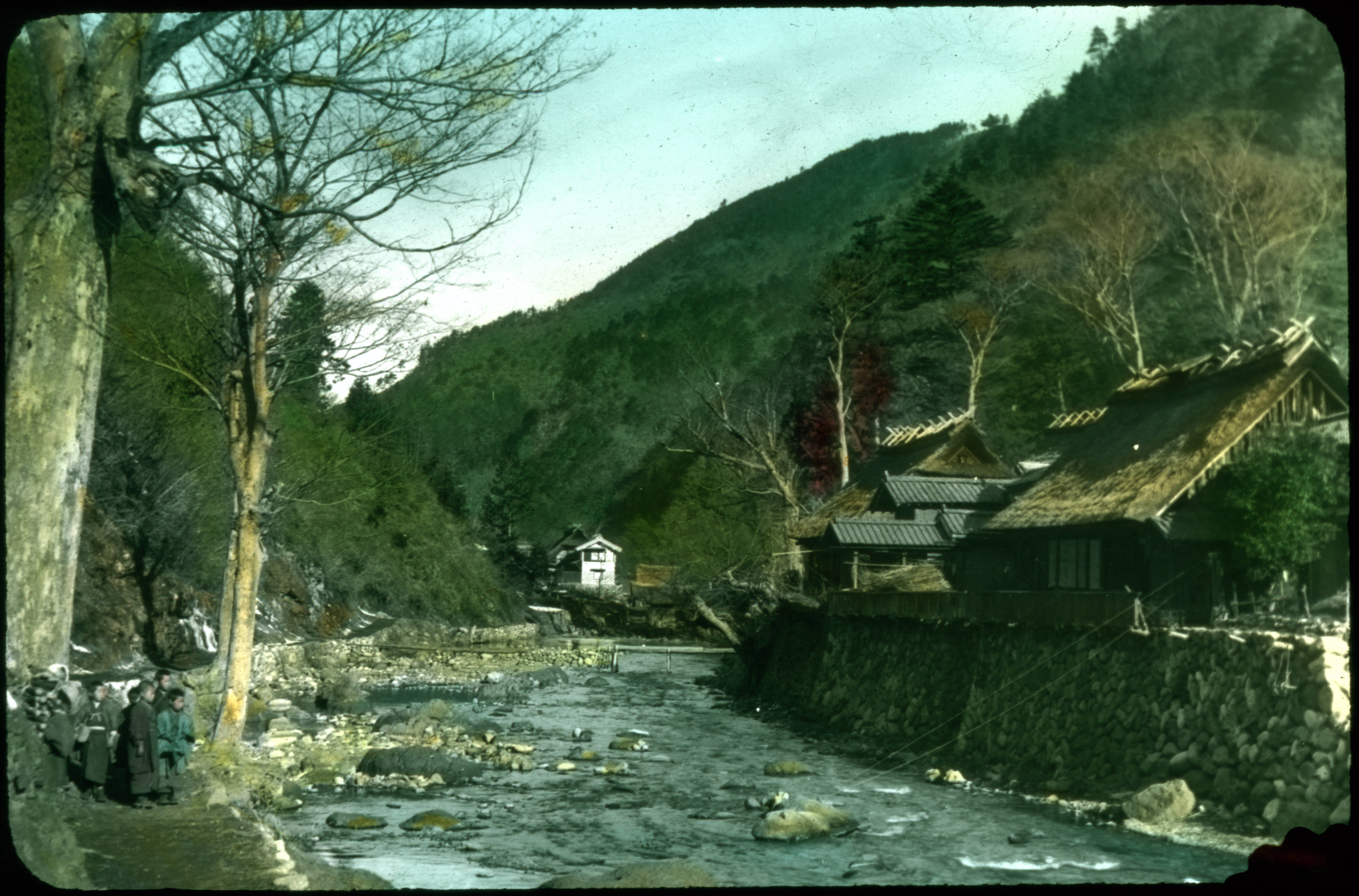
River in mountains; raised bank with houses on one side; Japanese children on side of river

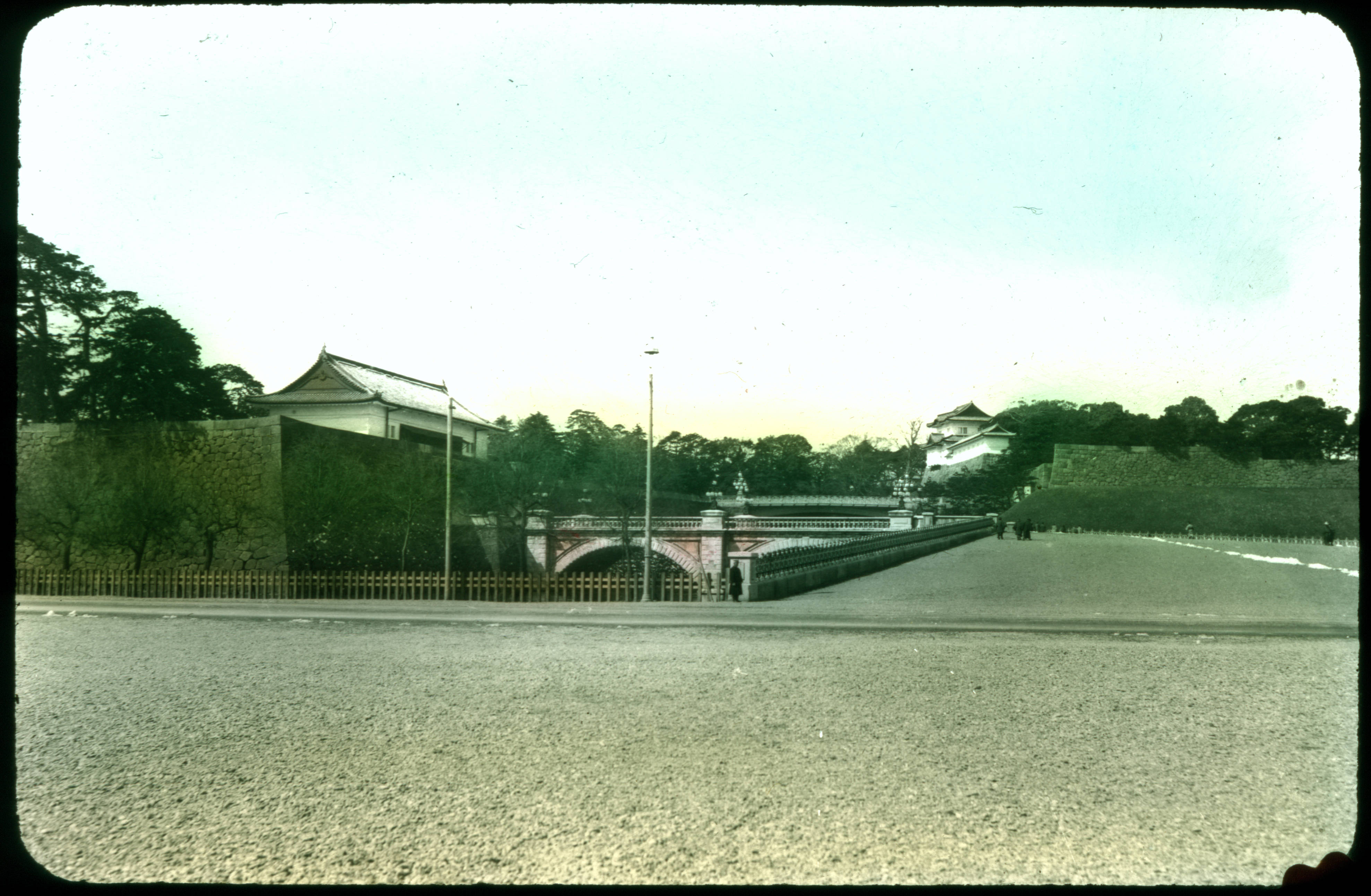
Road, sidewalk, pavement; stone walls and bridge, lamp standards; buildings and trees in background

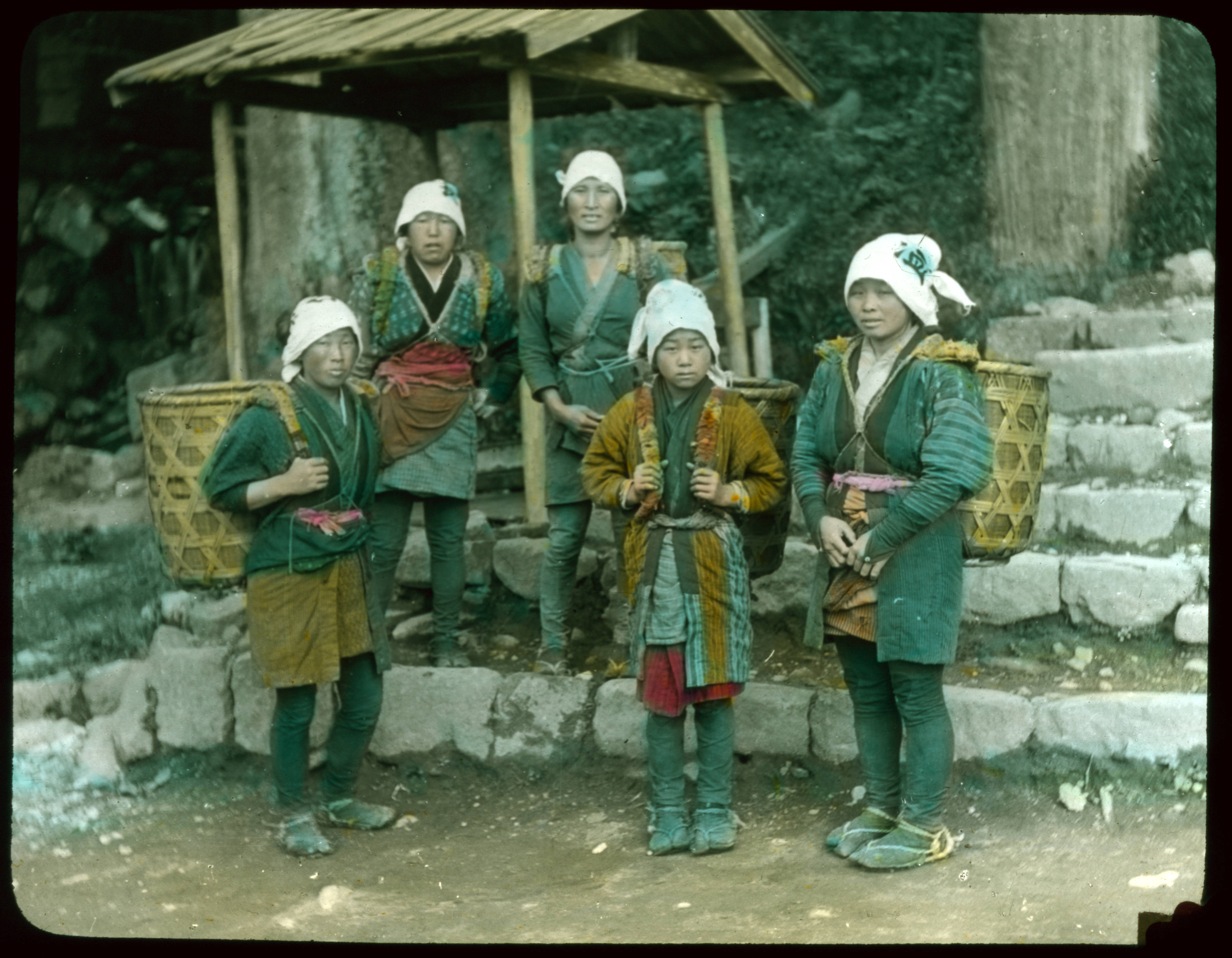
Rural women in local attire carrying large baskets on their backs

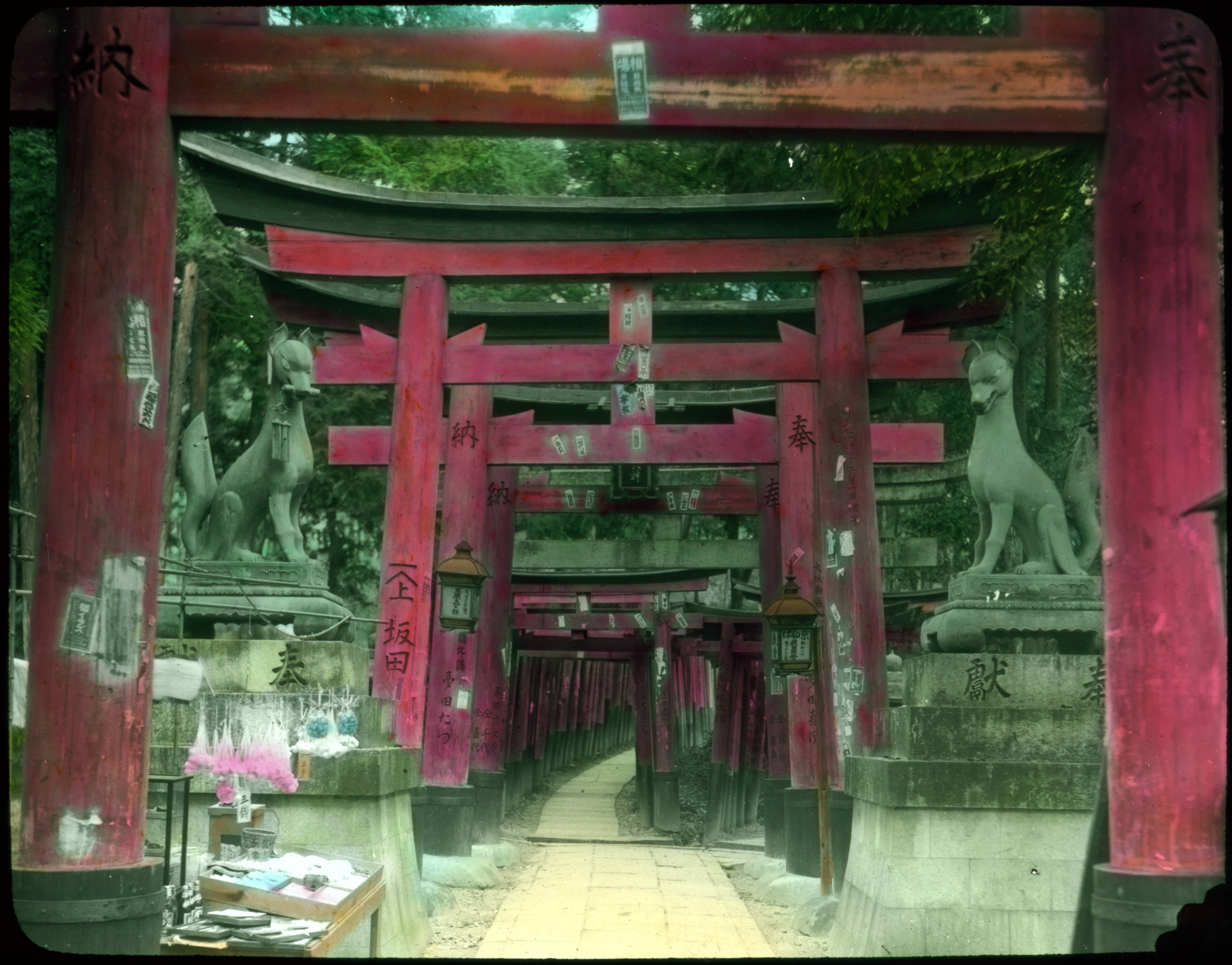
Series of red wooden gateways; stone animals on pedestals between first and second gateway

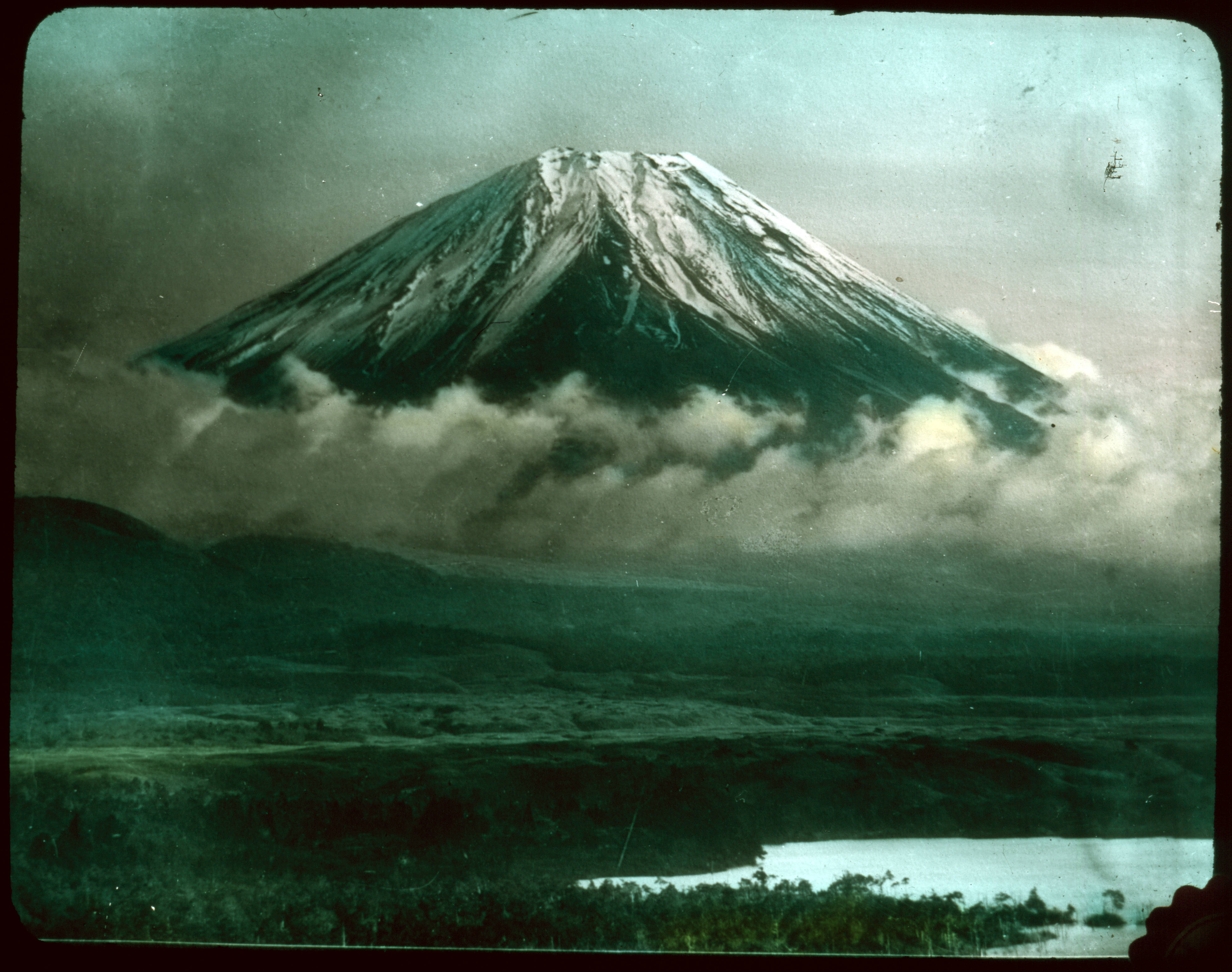
Snow-covered mountain (Mt. Fuji?) wreathed with clouds; low ground leading down to water in foreground

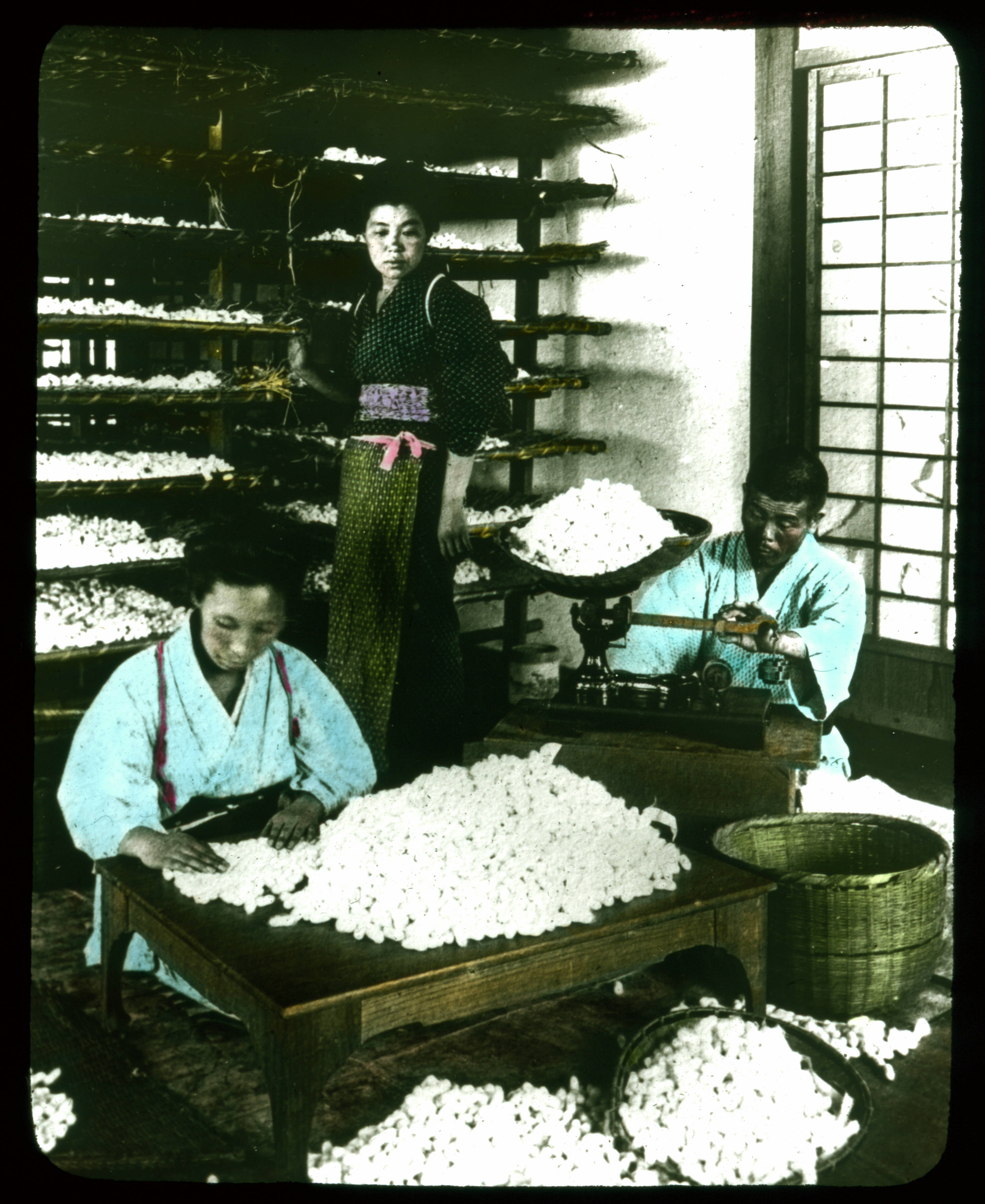
Sorting Silk

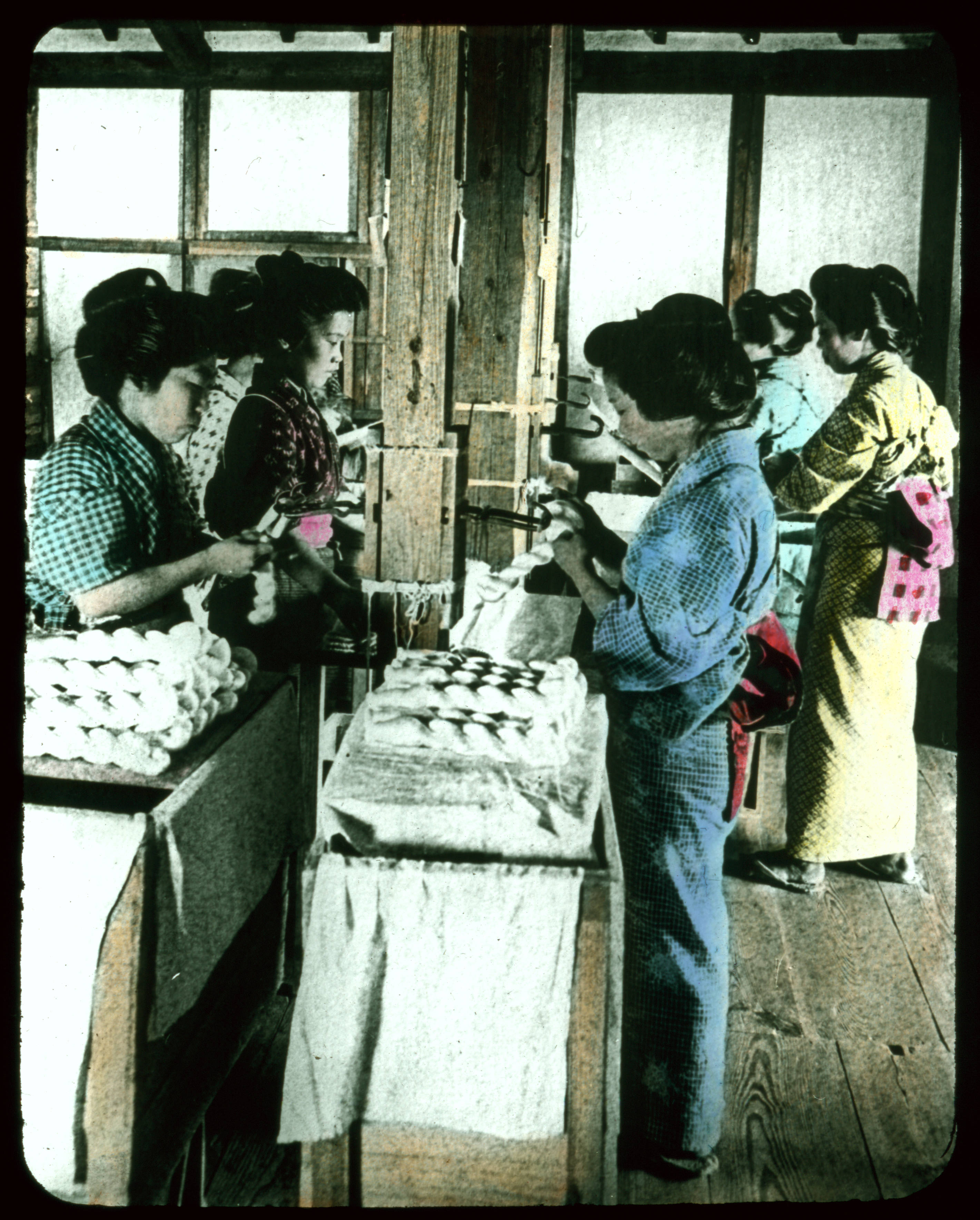
Sorting Silk

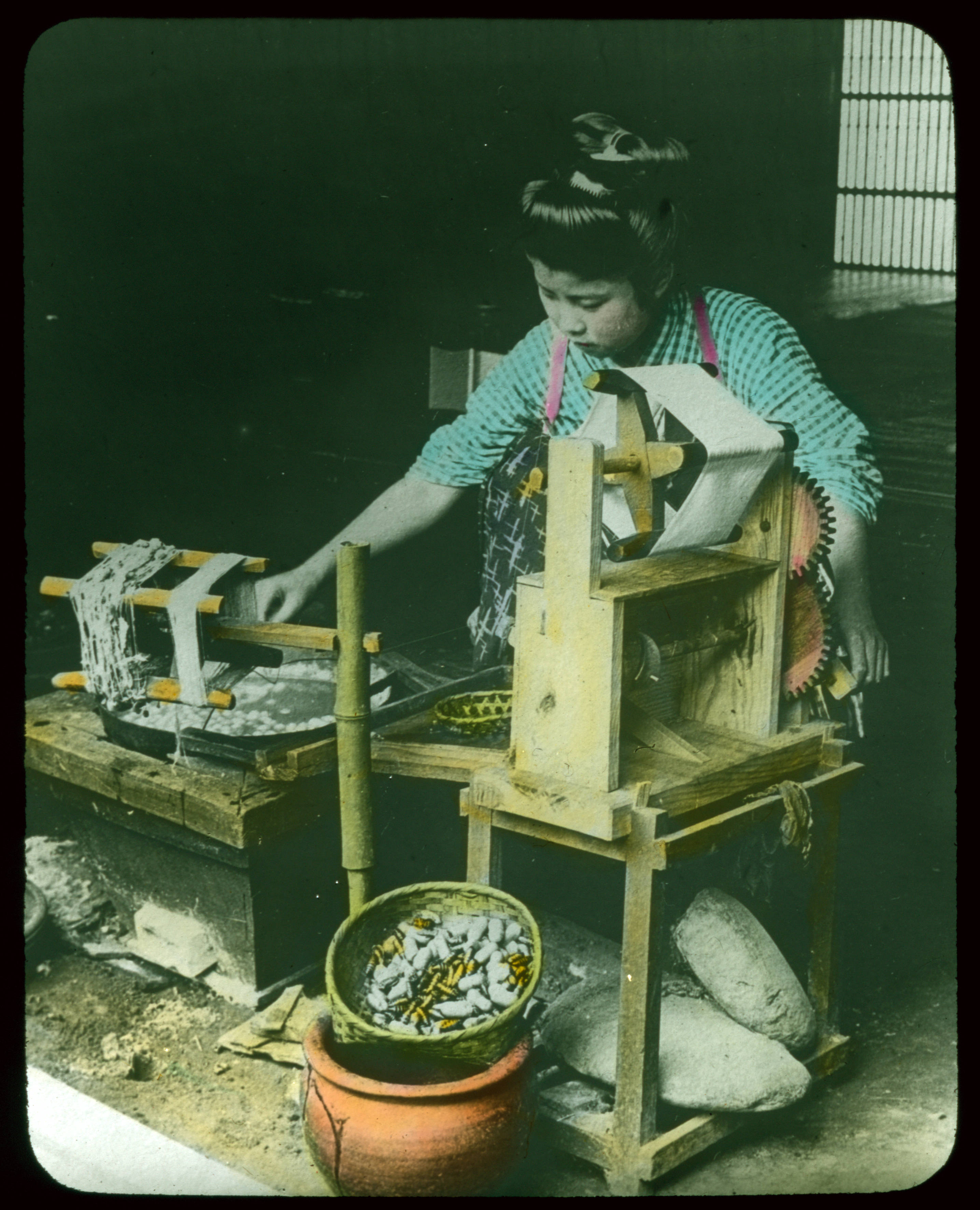
Taking Silk From Cocoons

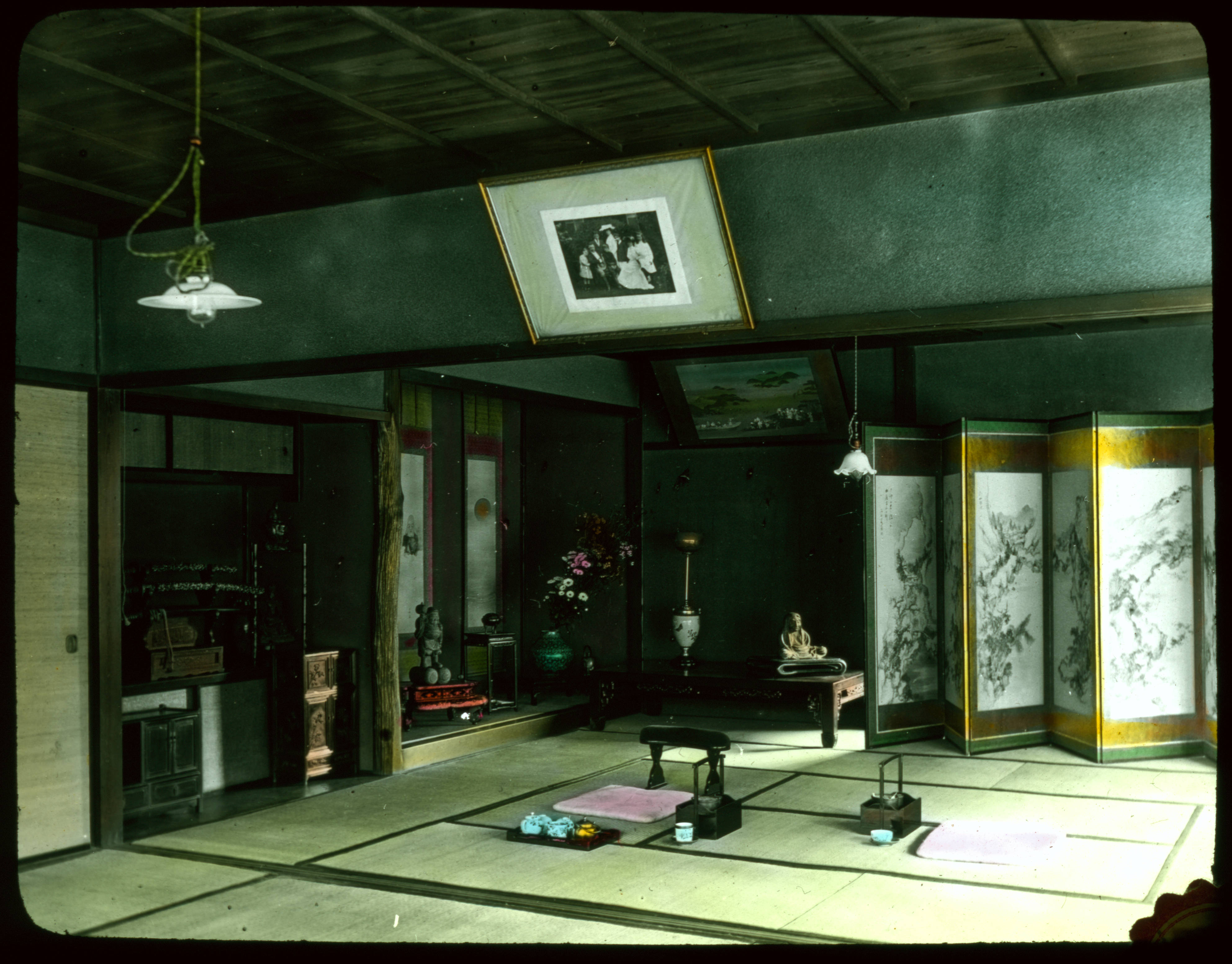
Tea implements in centre of richly furnished room

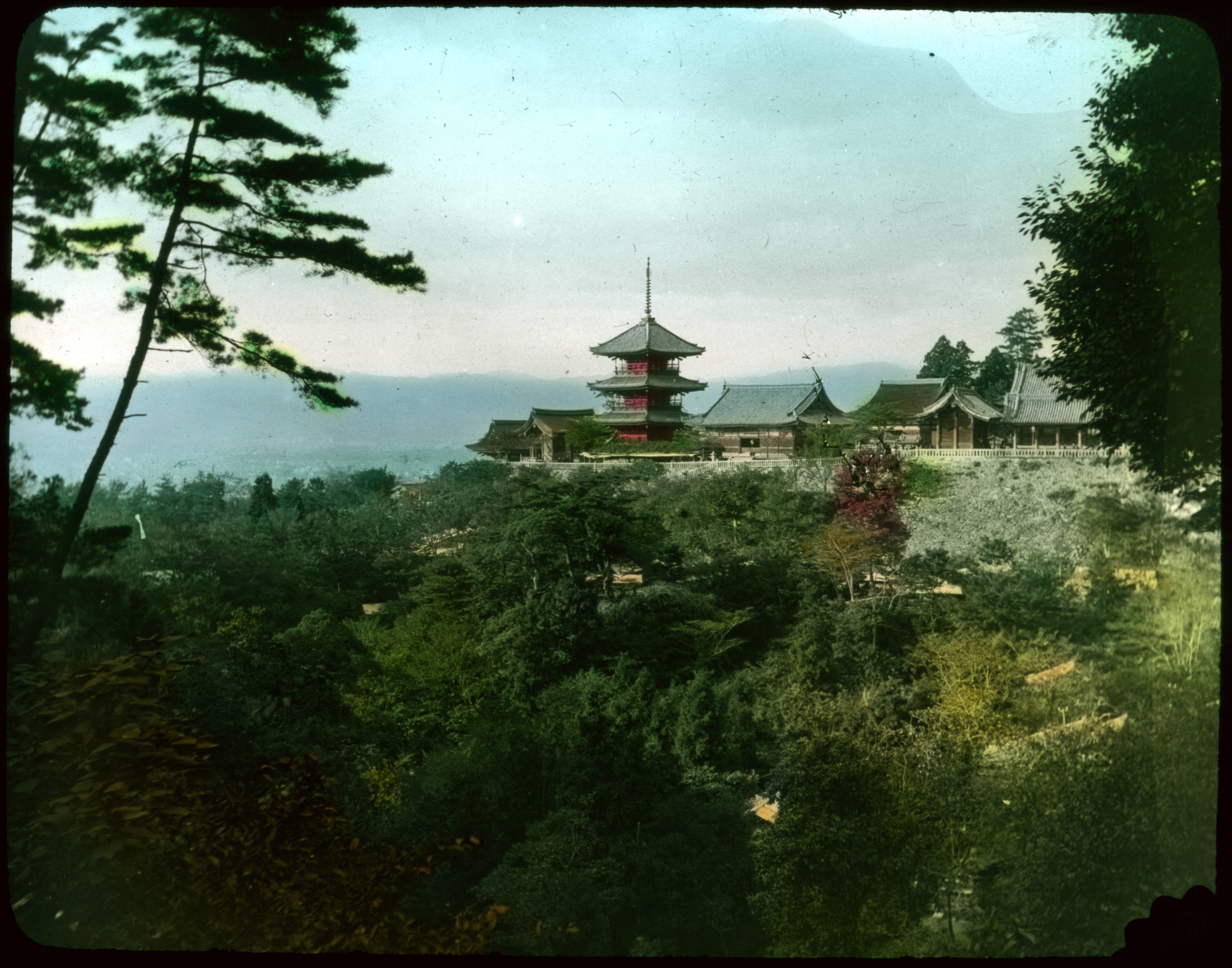
Temple and houses on hill over valley filled with trees

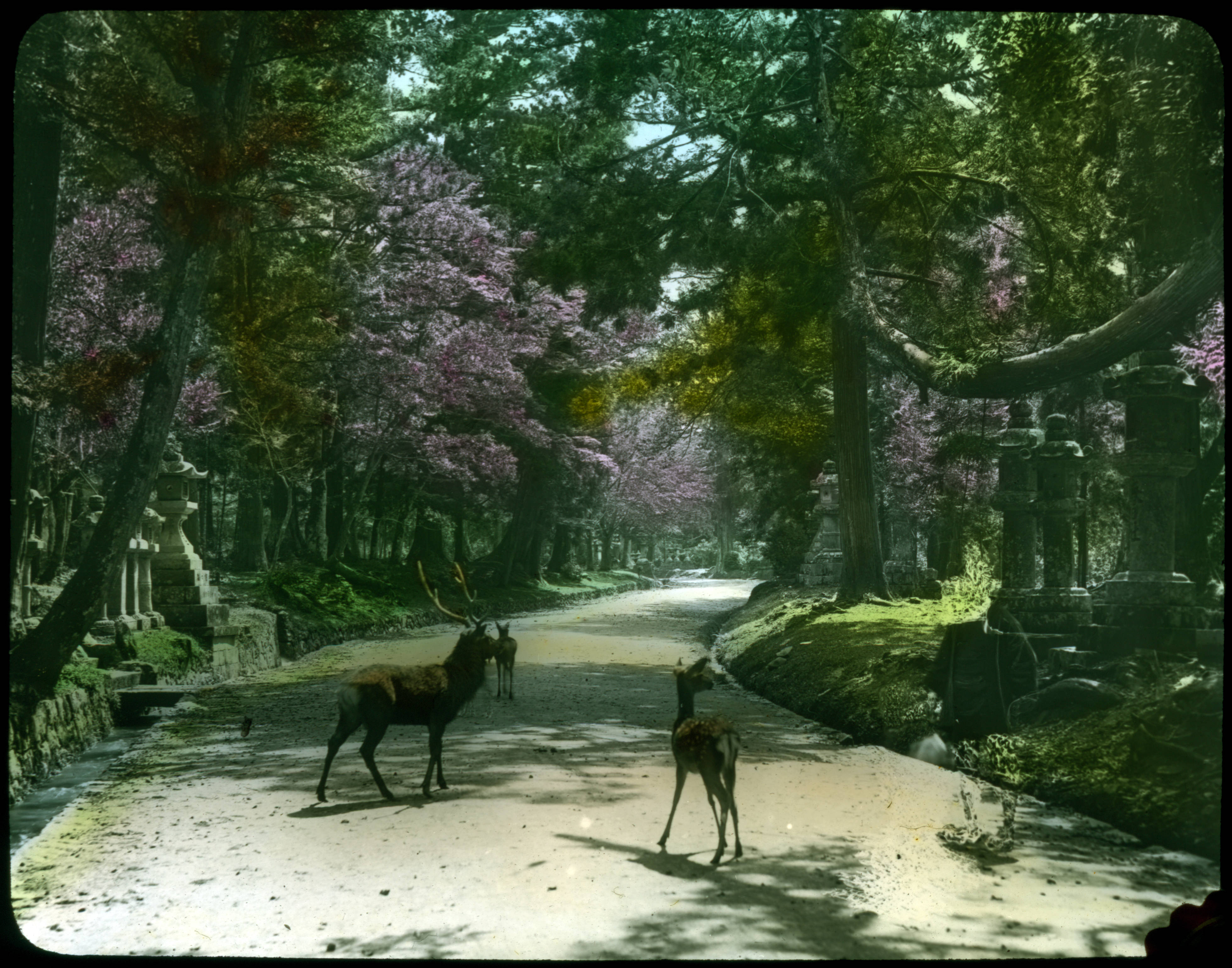
Three deer standing on road in (cemetery) garden; large flowering cherry trees, evergreens and stone monuments

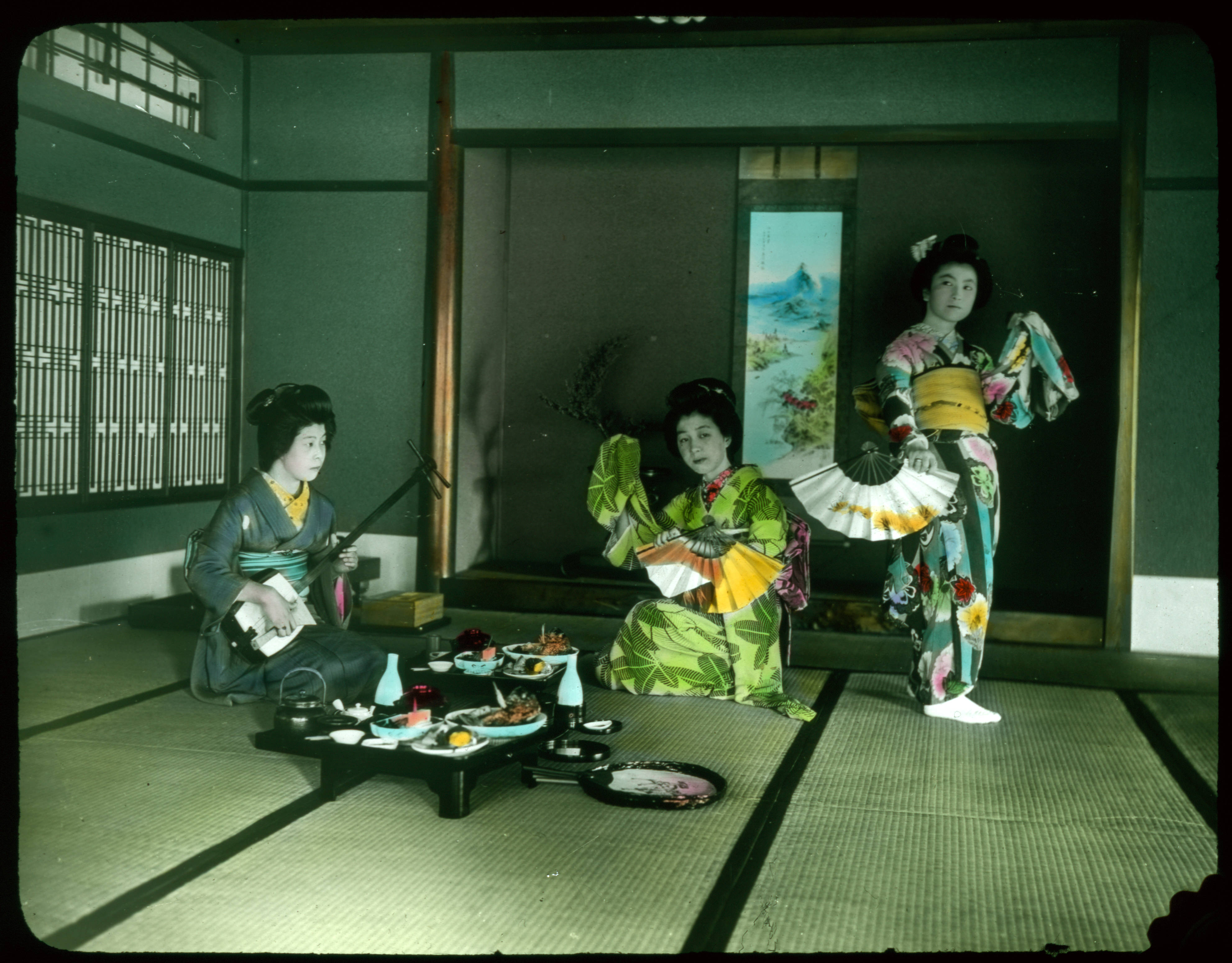
Three women with fans, musical instrument and a table set with food

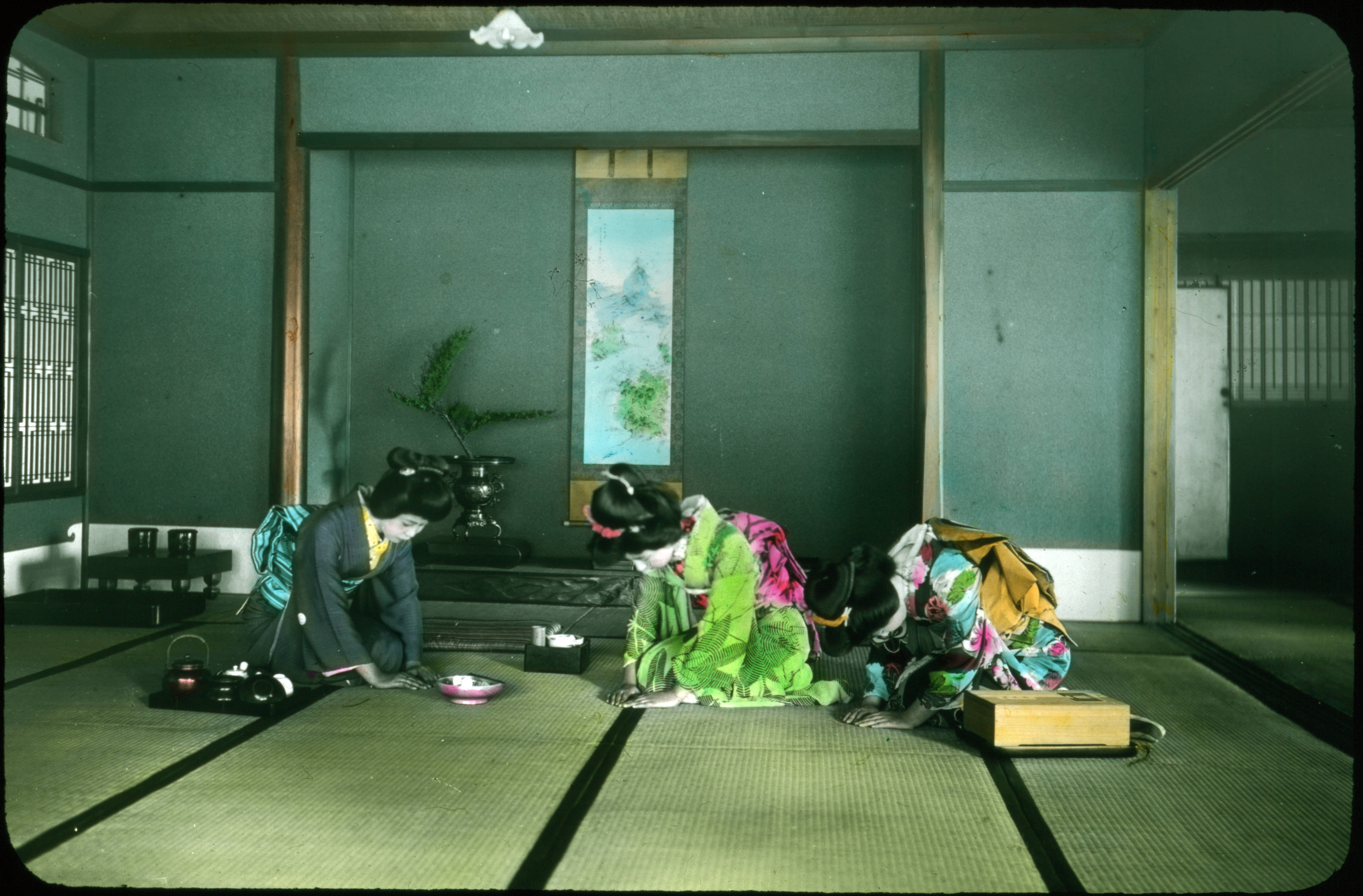
Three women with tea implements

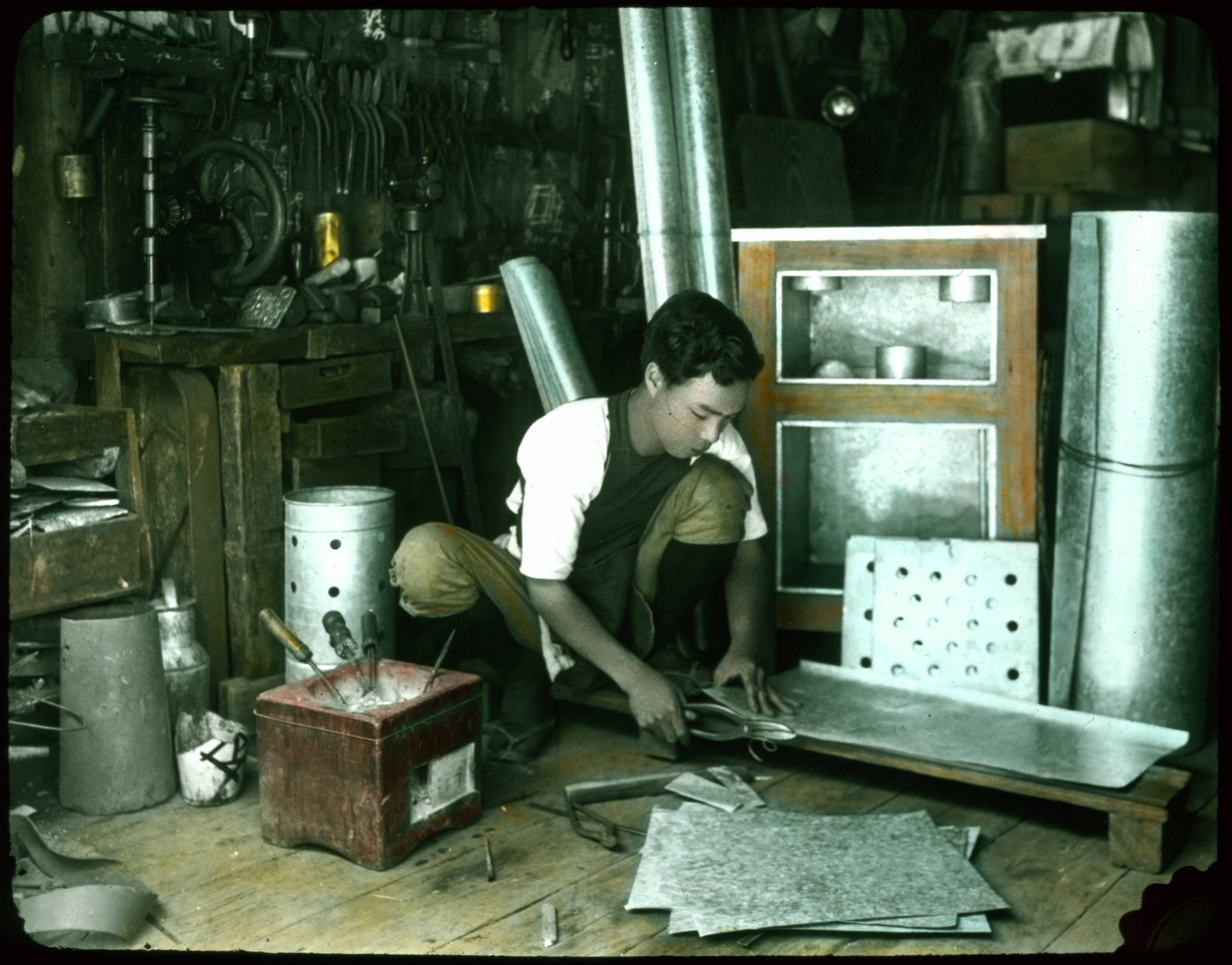
Tinsmith at work

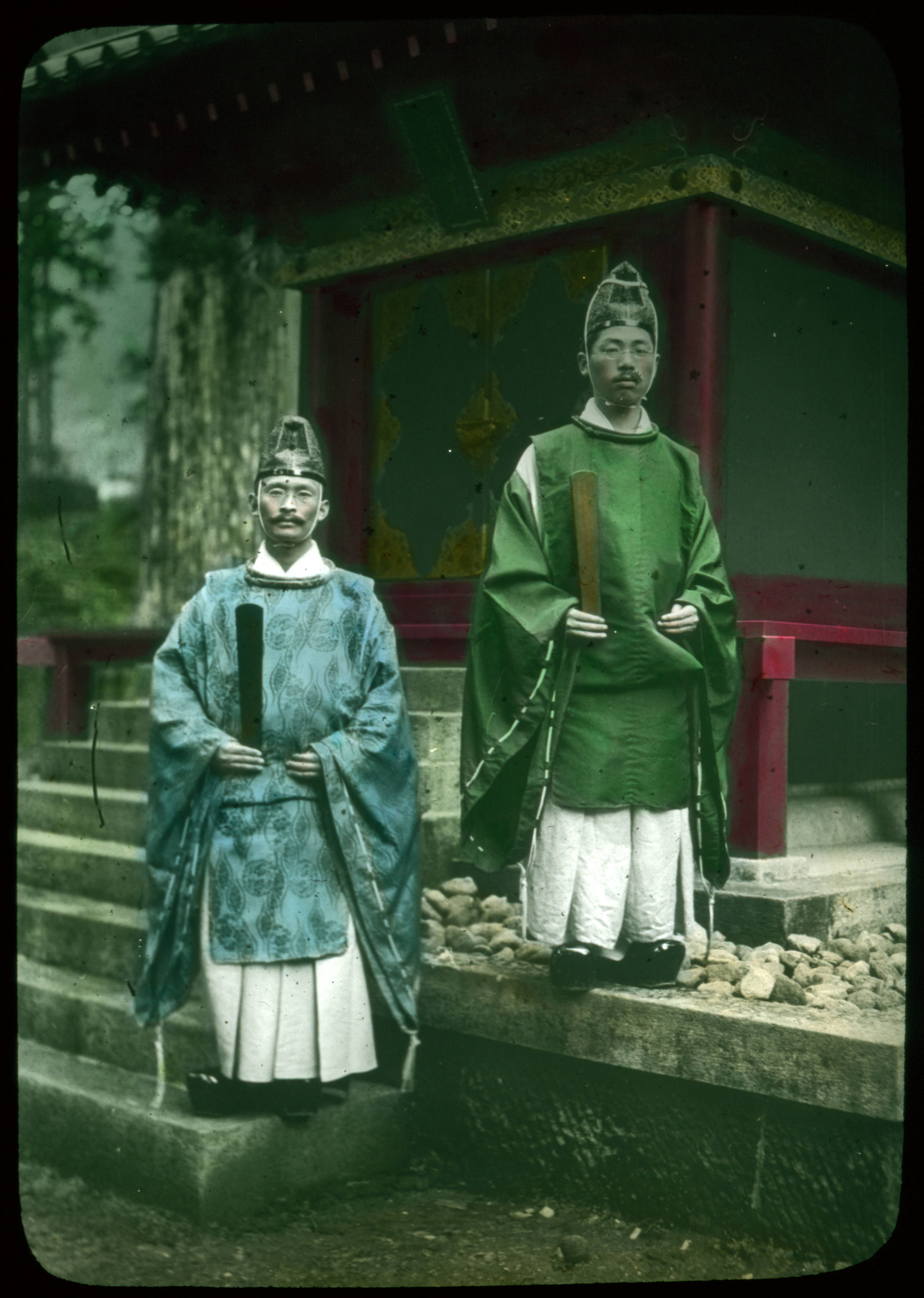
Two (priests?) outside shrine

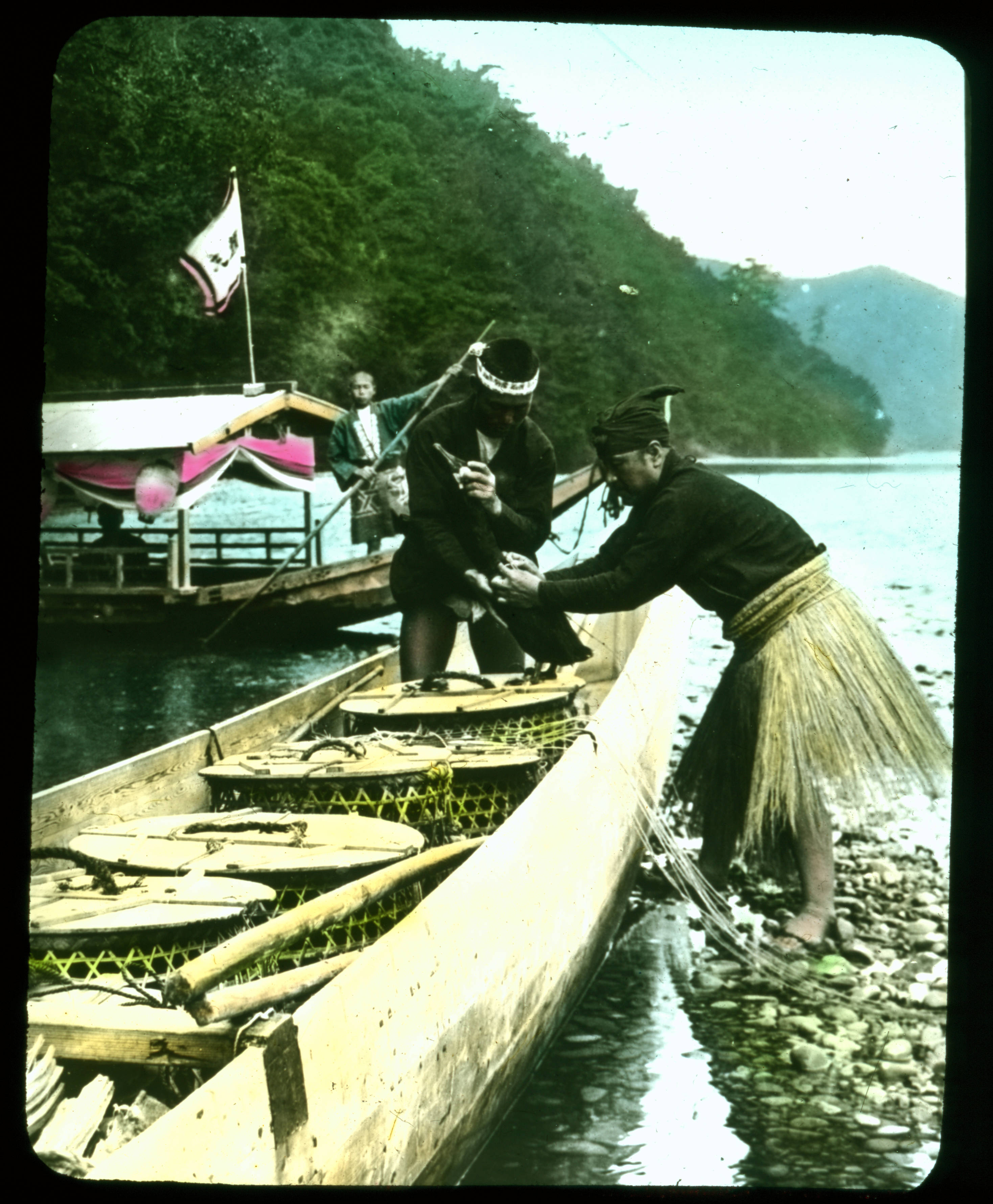
Two boats on river, a passenger boat being poled and a fishing boat filled with lidded open work baskets

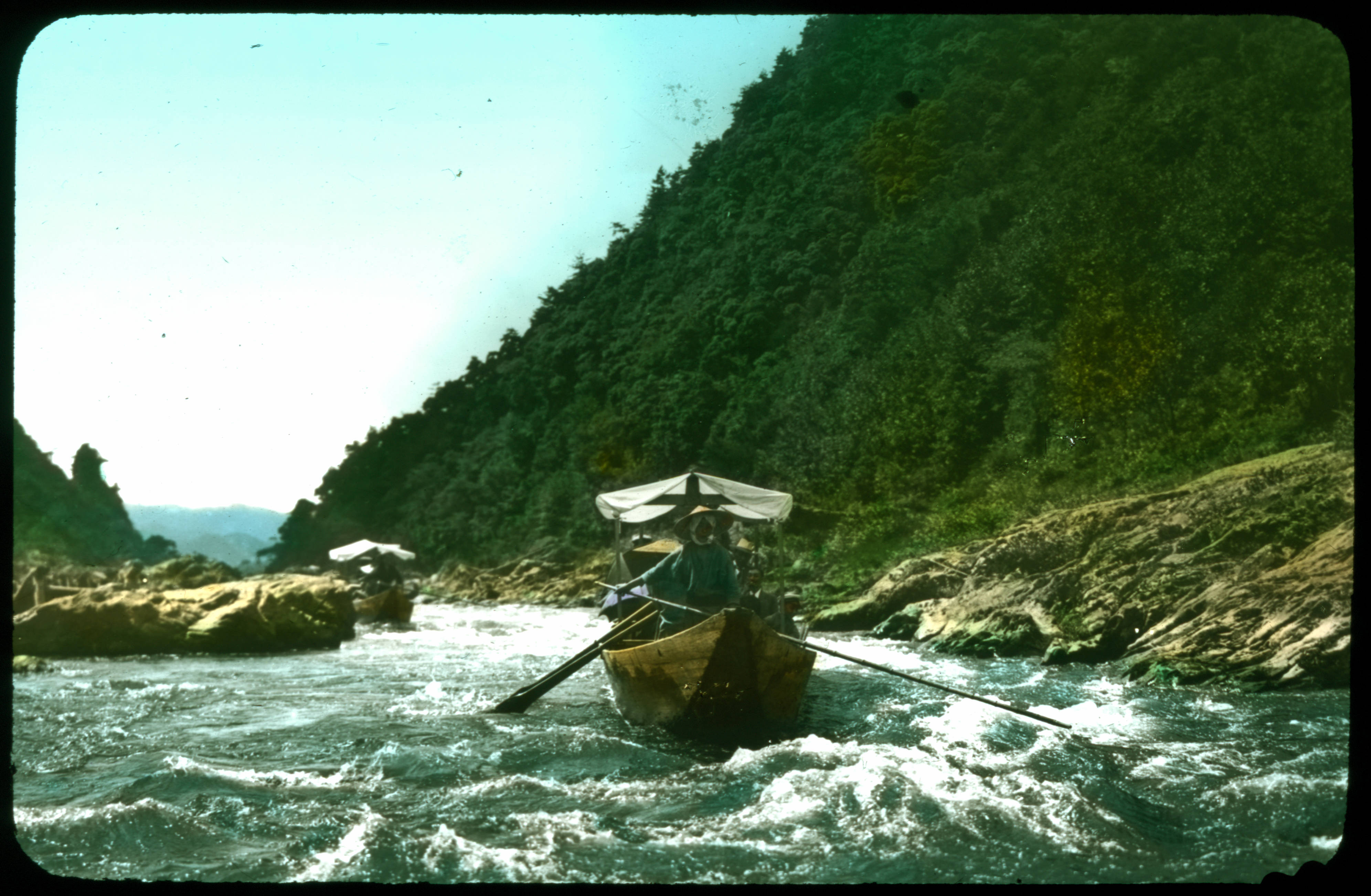
Two boats with cloth canopies being rowed along river; wooded mountain on one side; rushing water in foreground

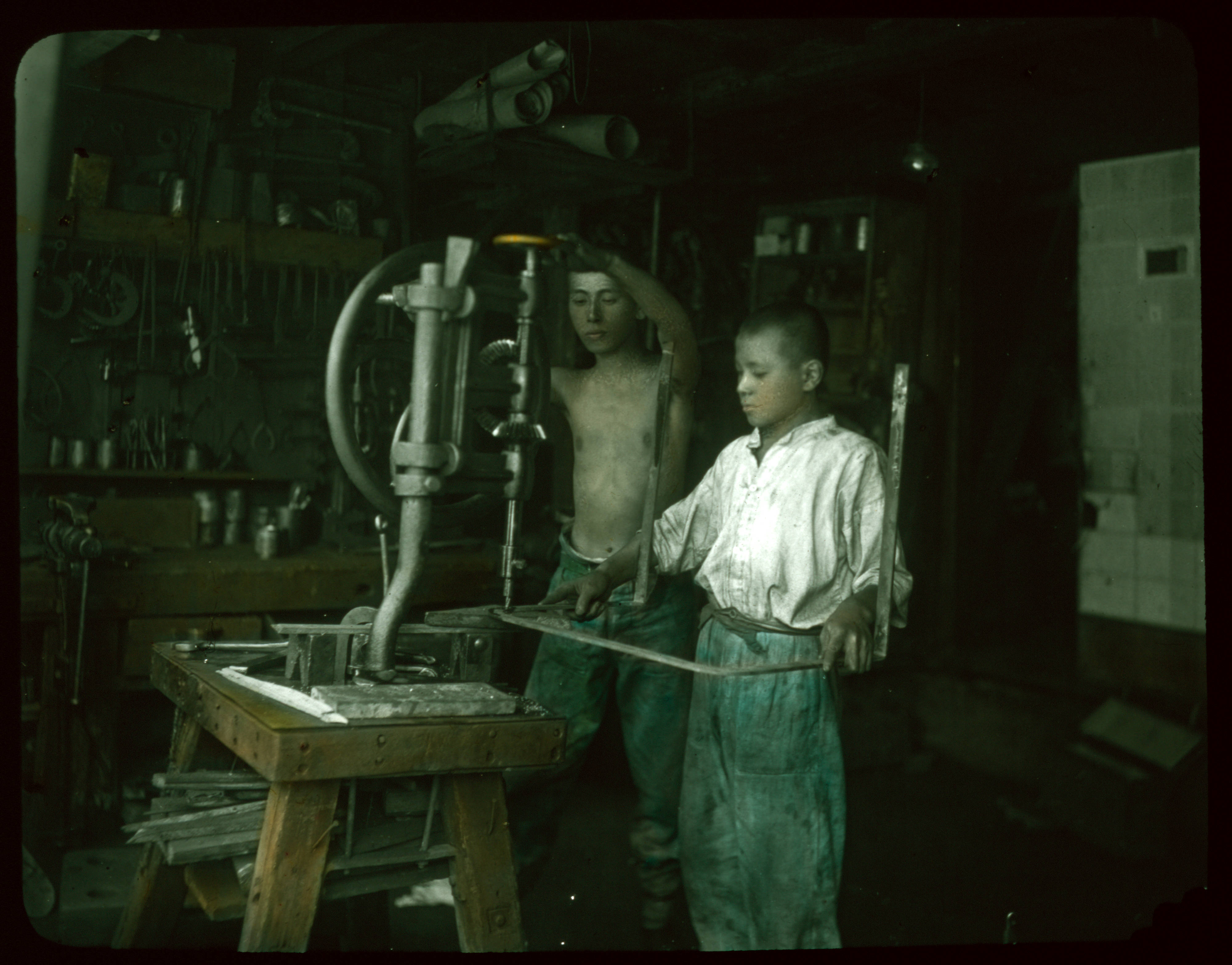
Two boys using drill press

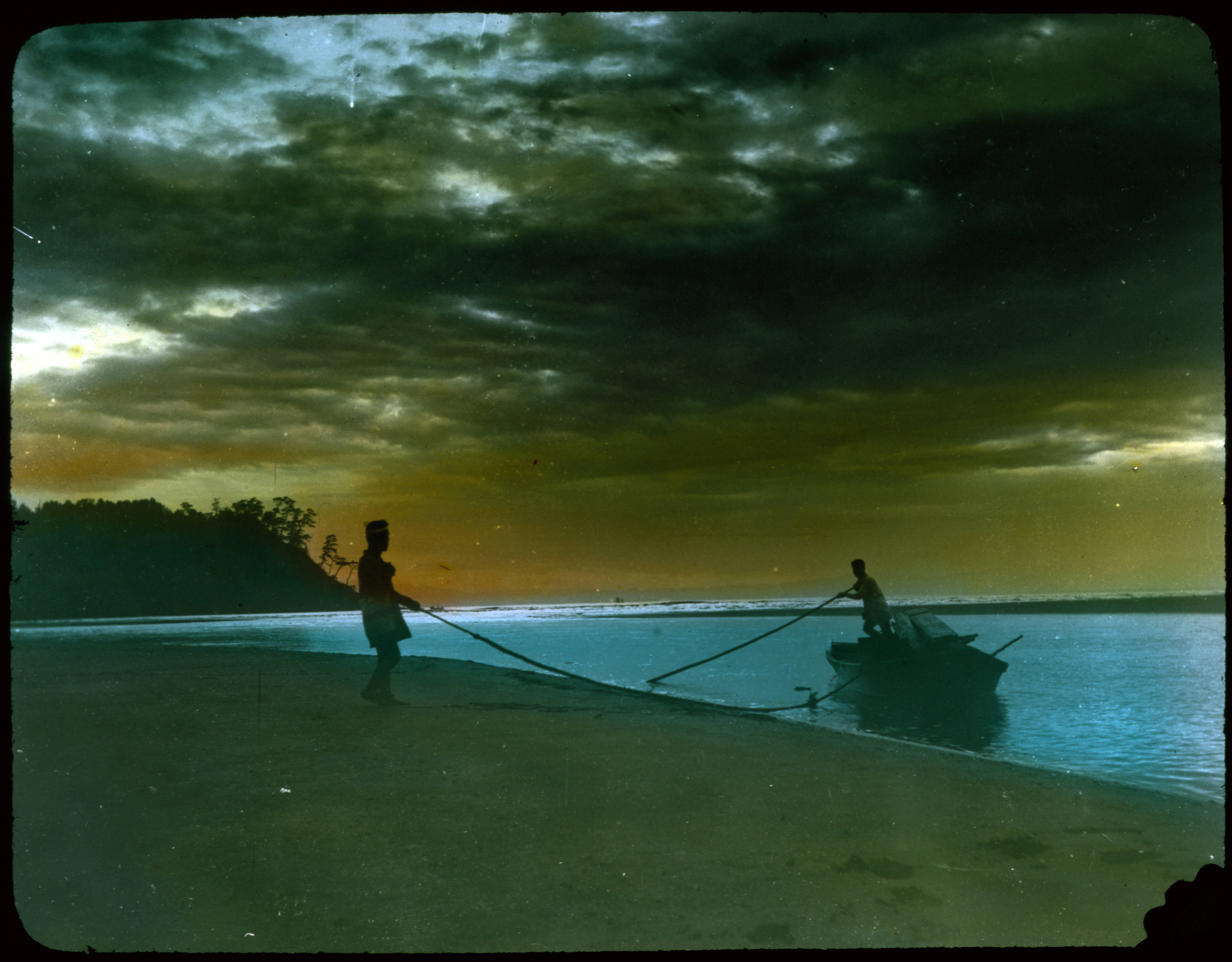
Two men landing boat on beach

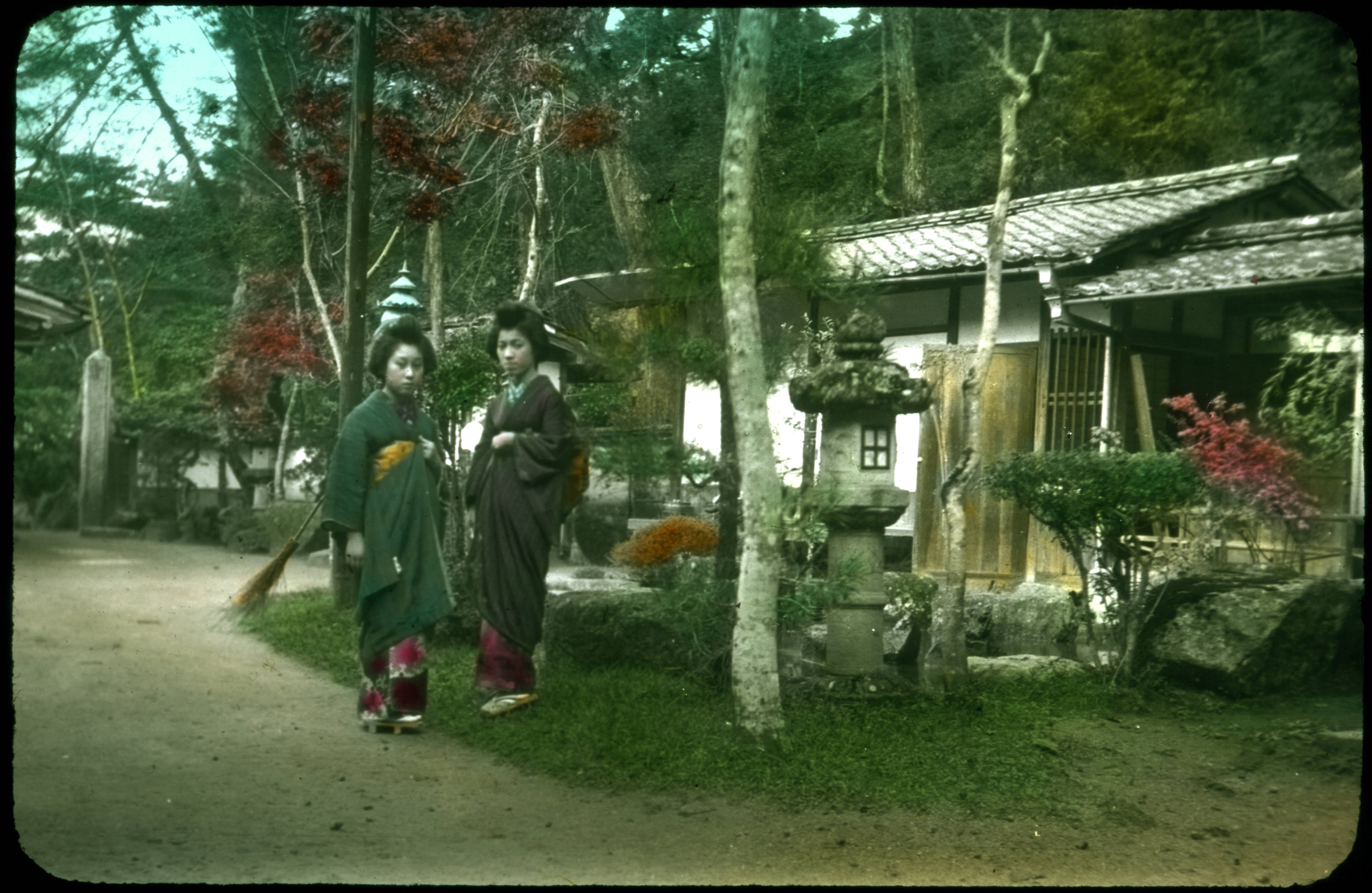
Two women in traditional dress posing outside house in tiny ornamental garden

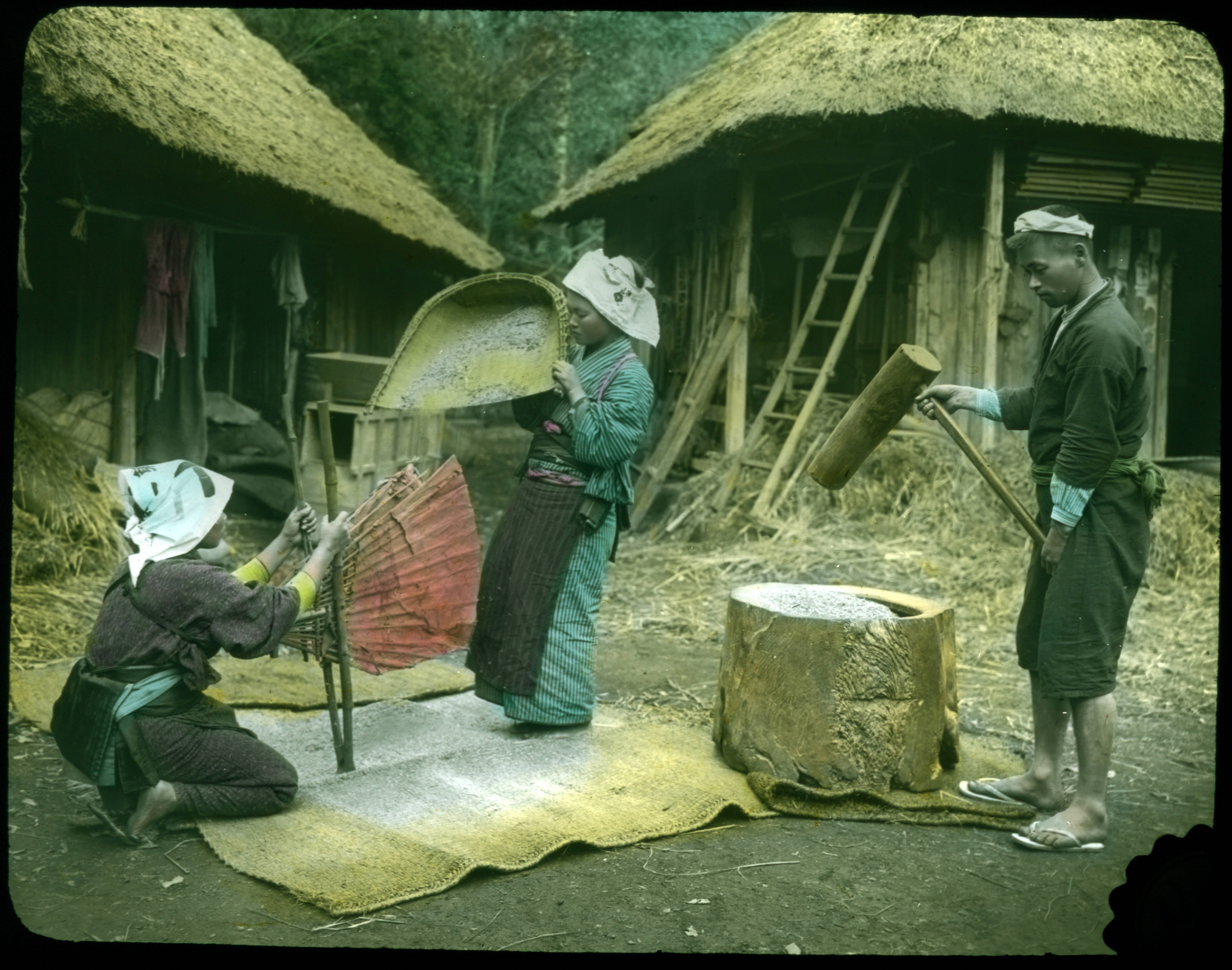
Two women winnowing rice and man pounding rice flour

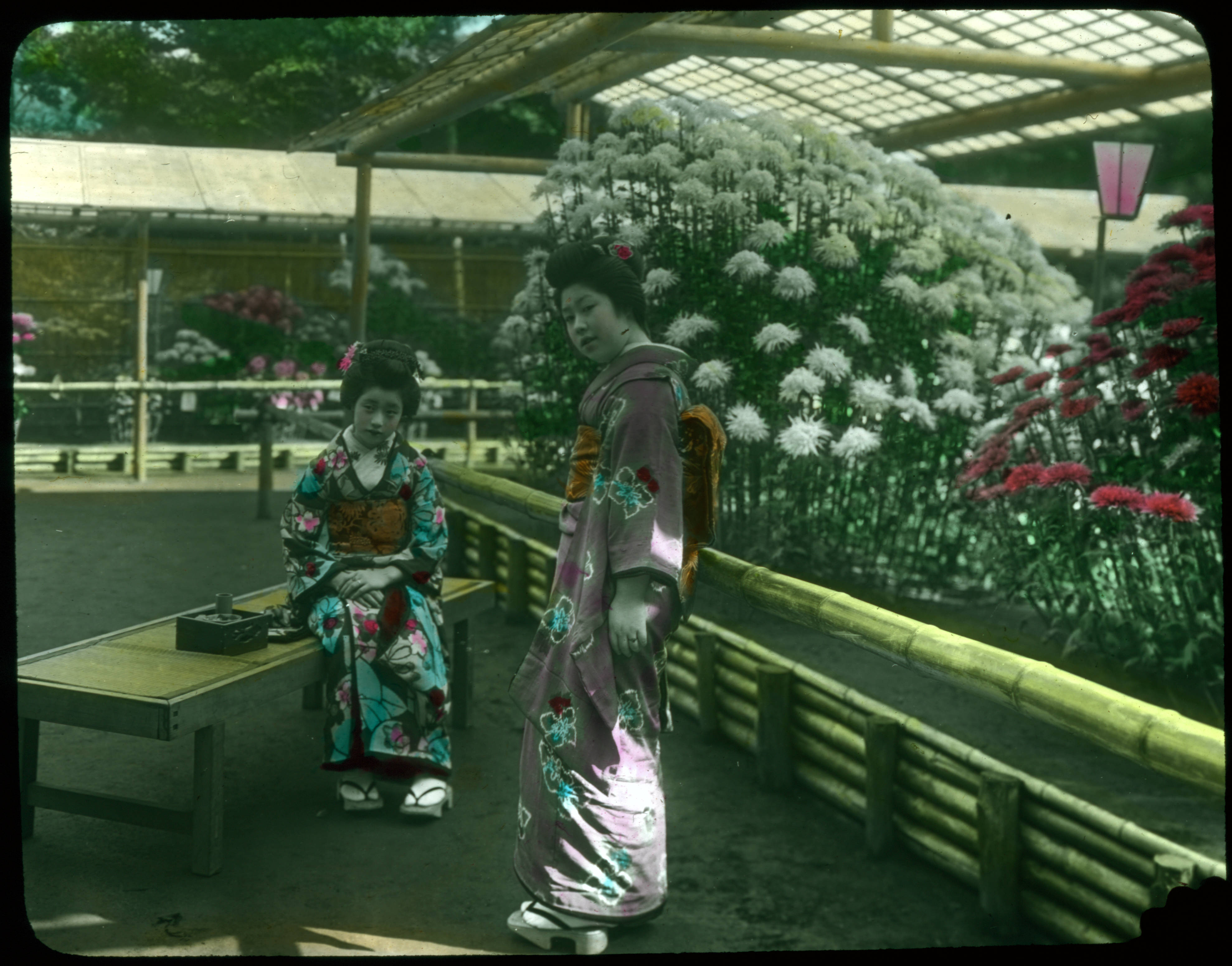
Two young women in Kimonos, one standing, one seated on wooden bench outside open greenhouses filled with blooming flowers

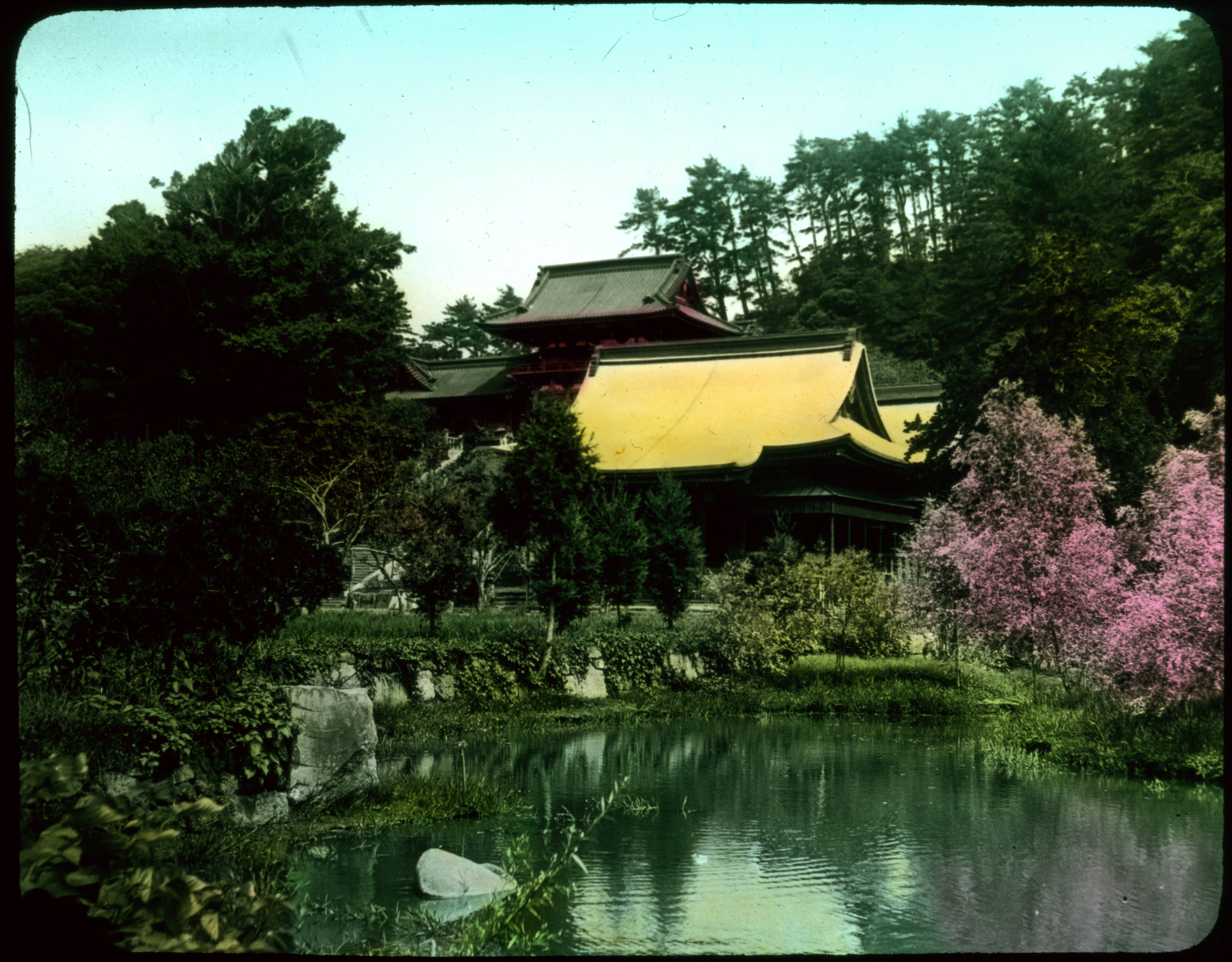
Unidentified building with some yellow roofs with pond and trees (including flowering plum trees)

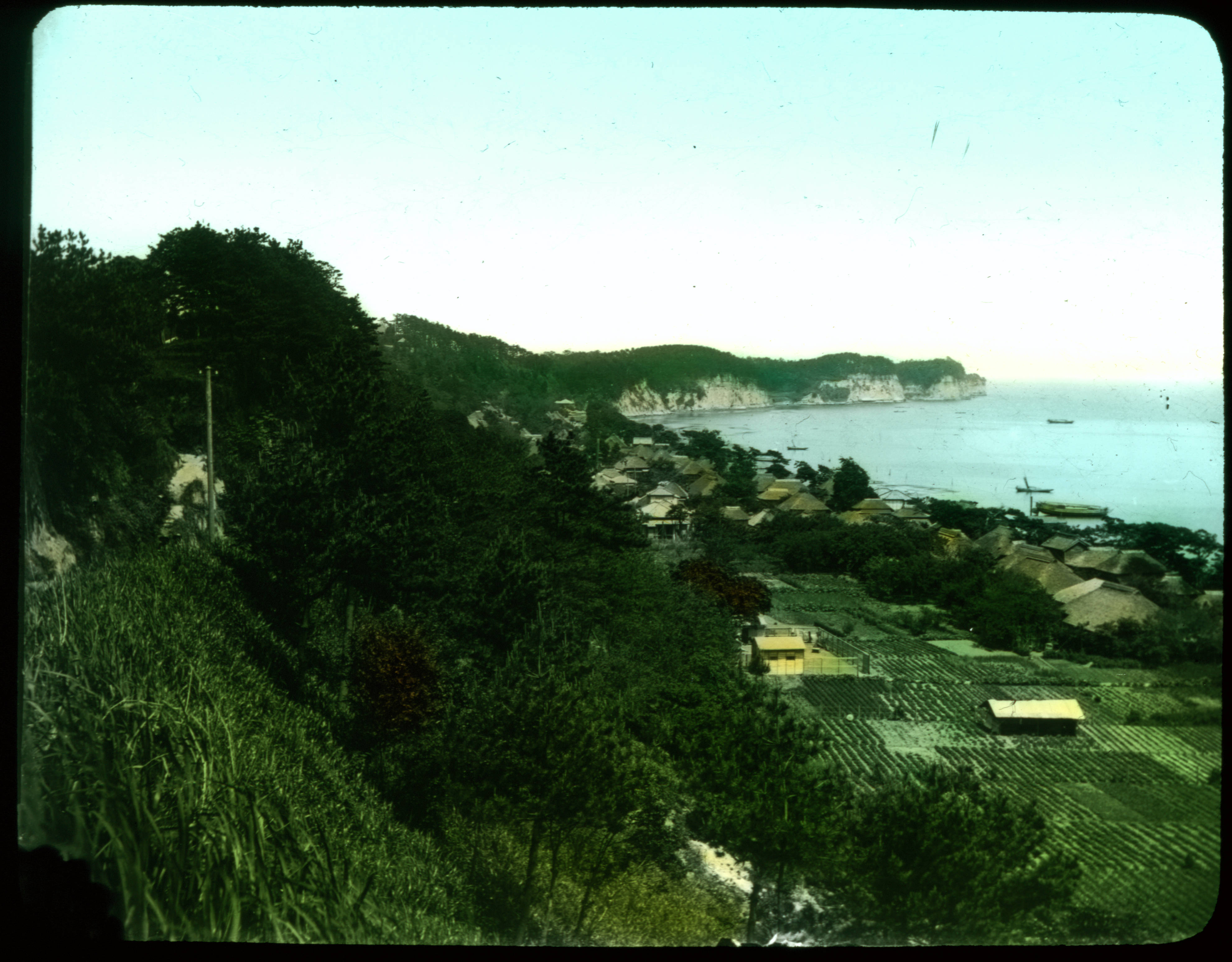
Village on a bay; fields and hillside in foreground

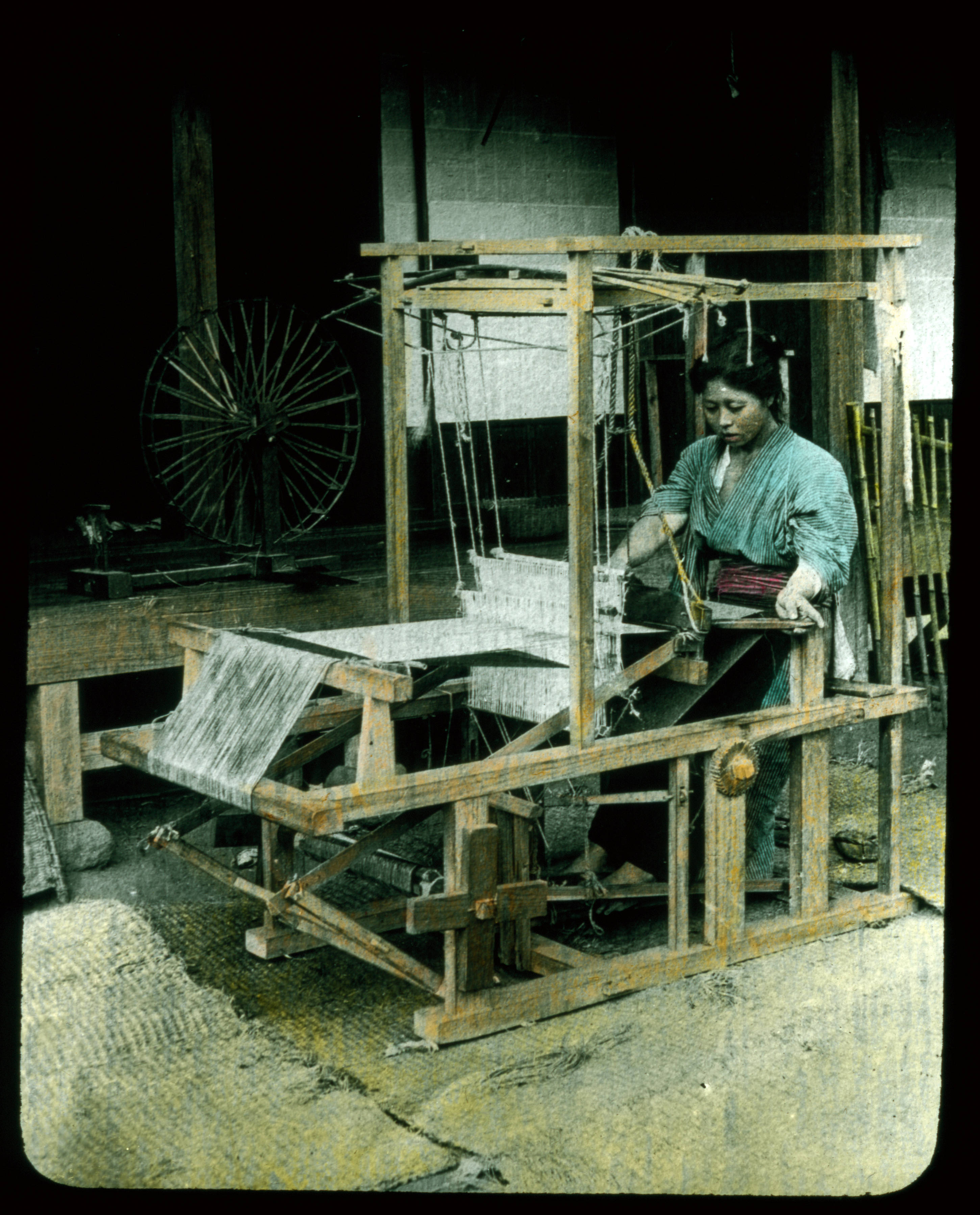
Weaving (silk) on hand loom

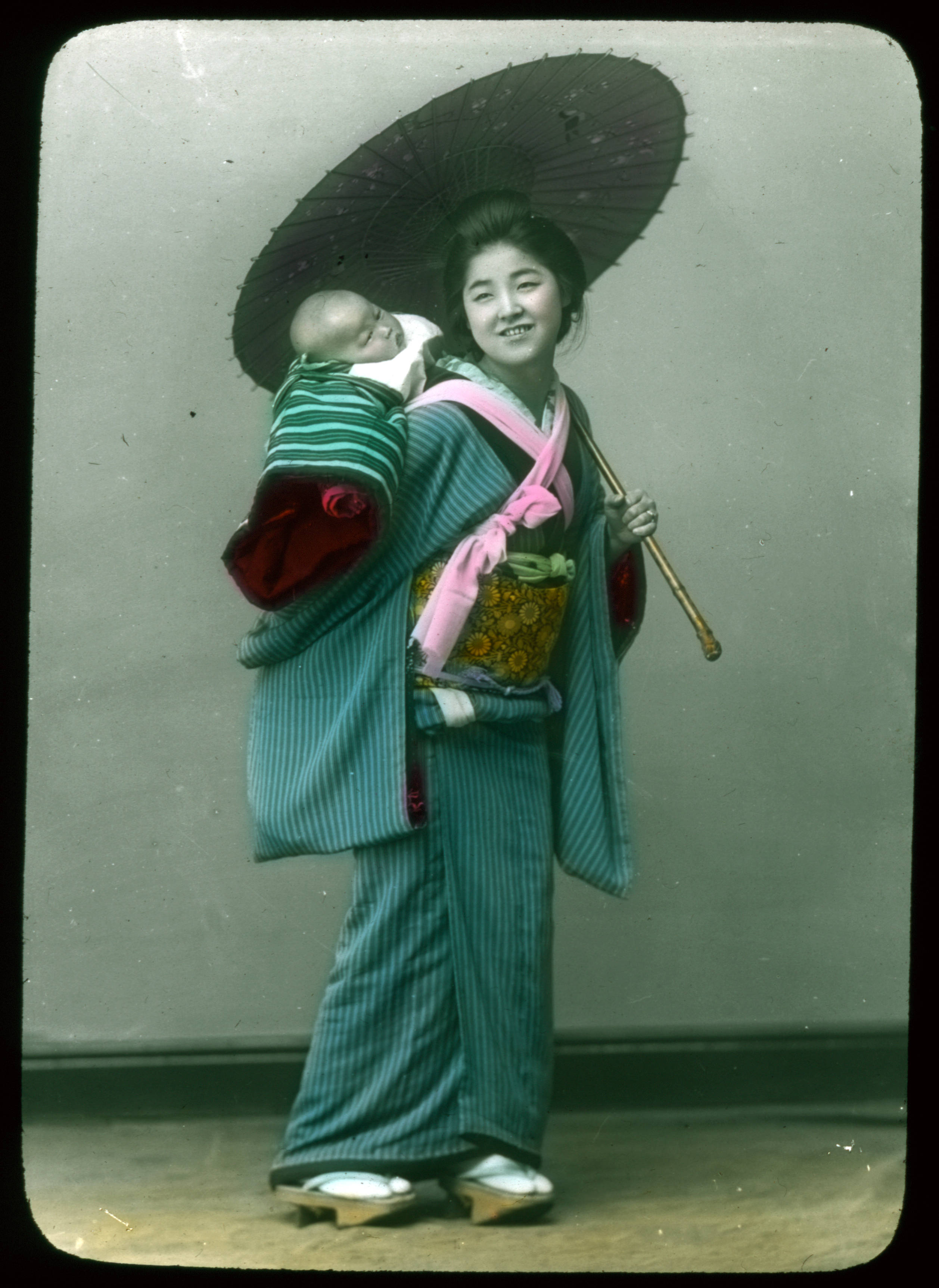
Woman in traditional dress holding open parasol and carrying baby on her back

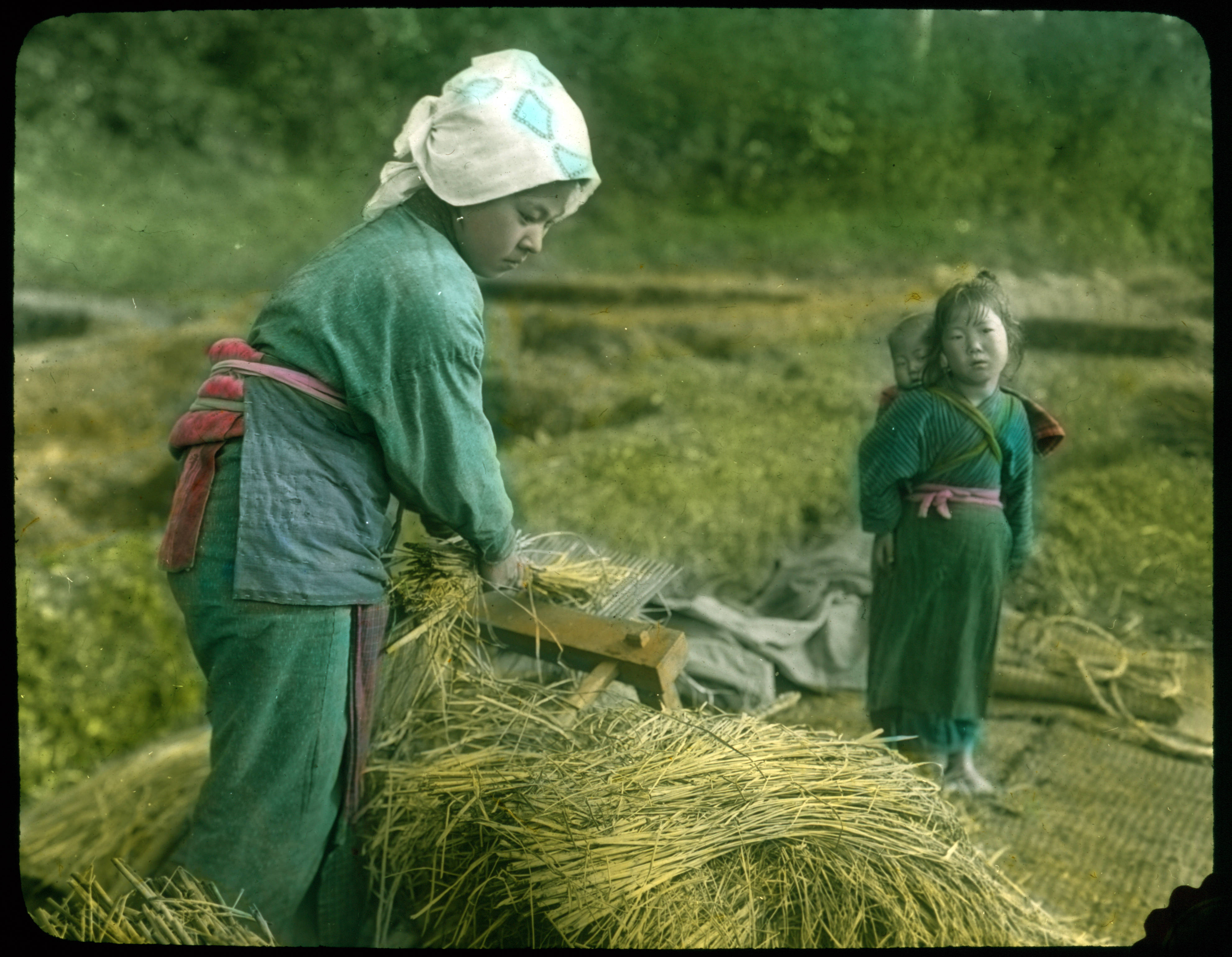
Woman separating rice from chaff with steel comb

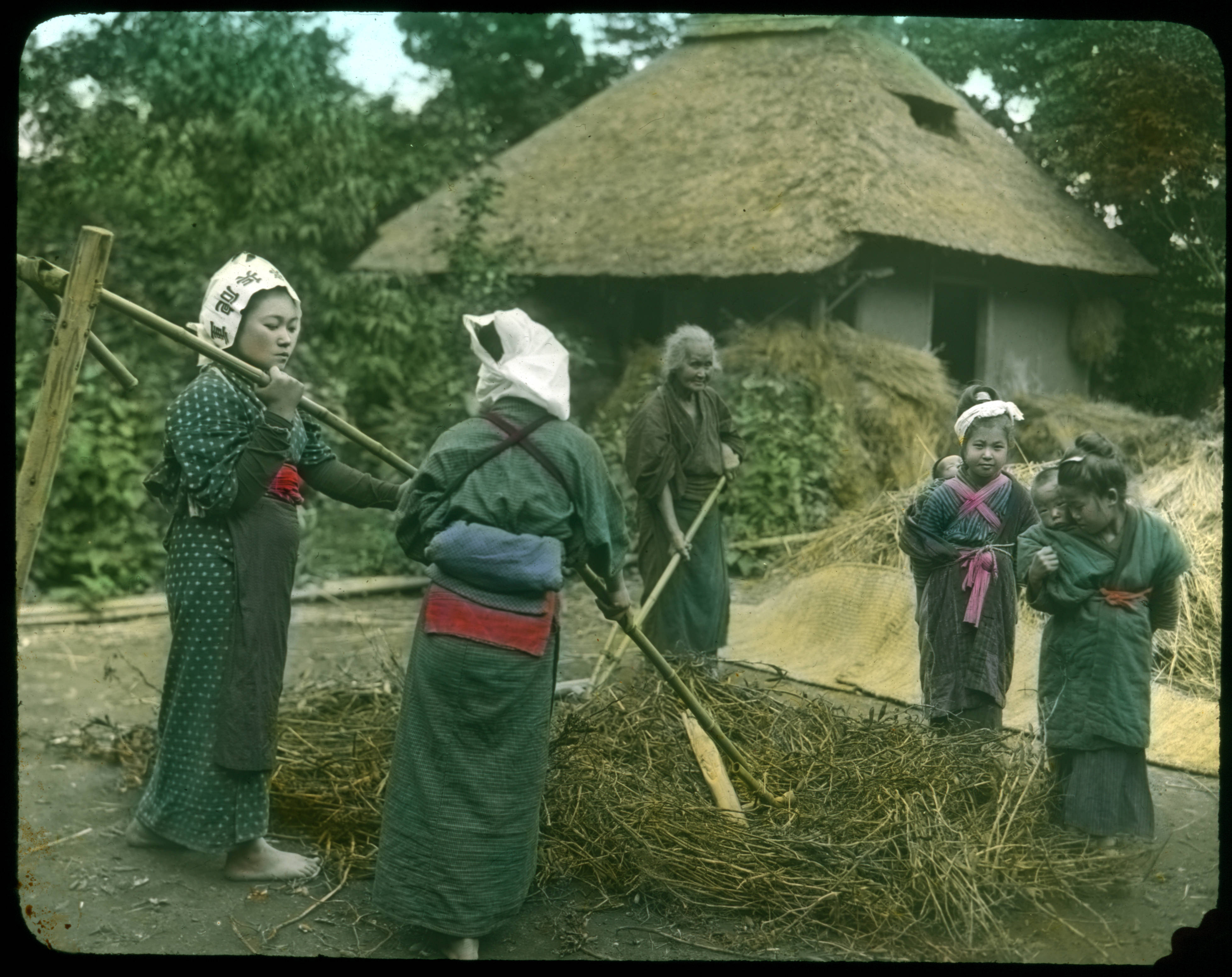
Women at work with children watching

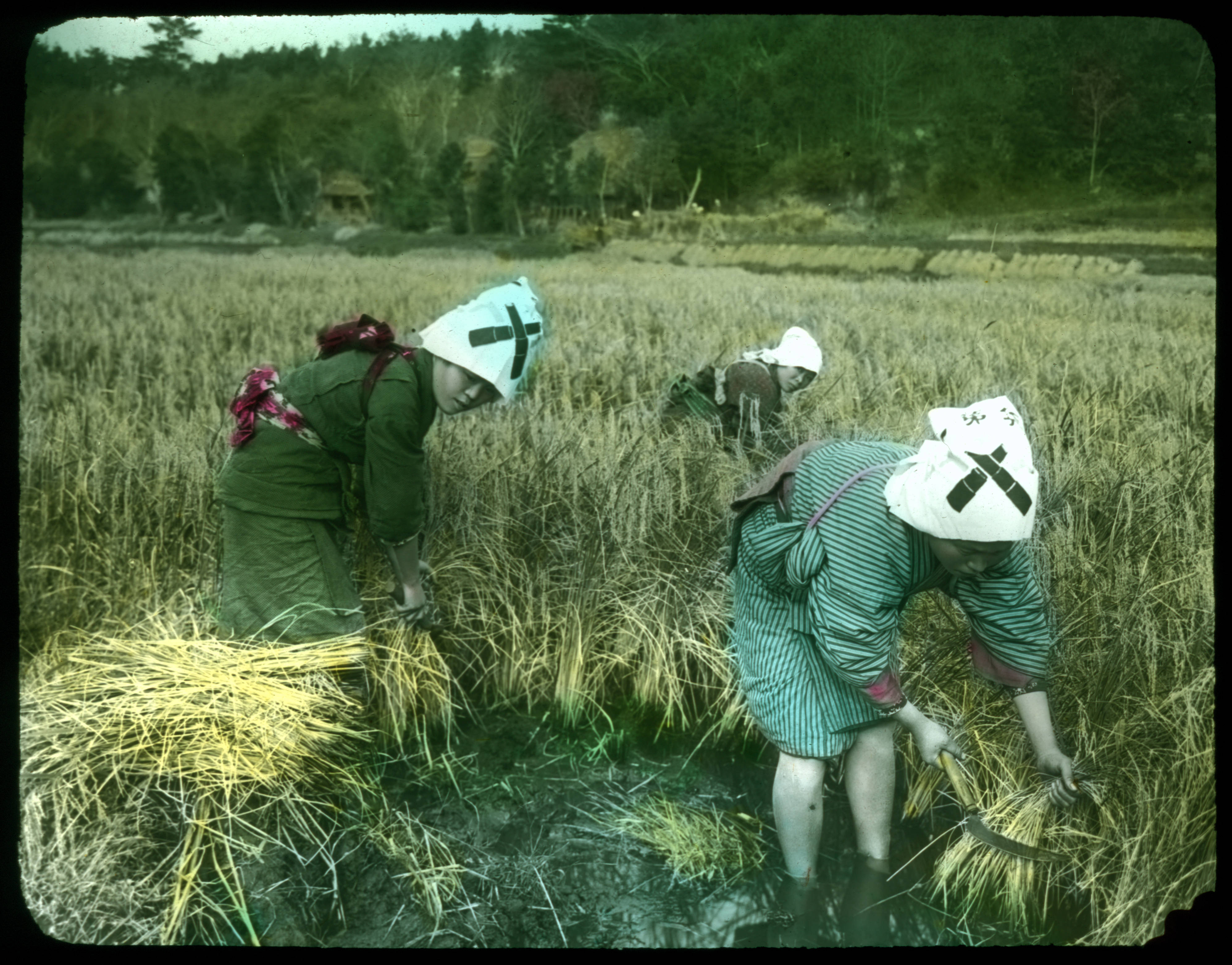
Women harvesting rice

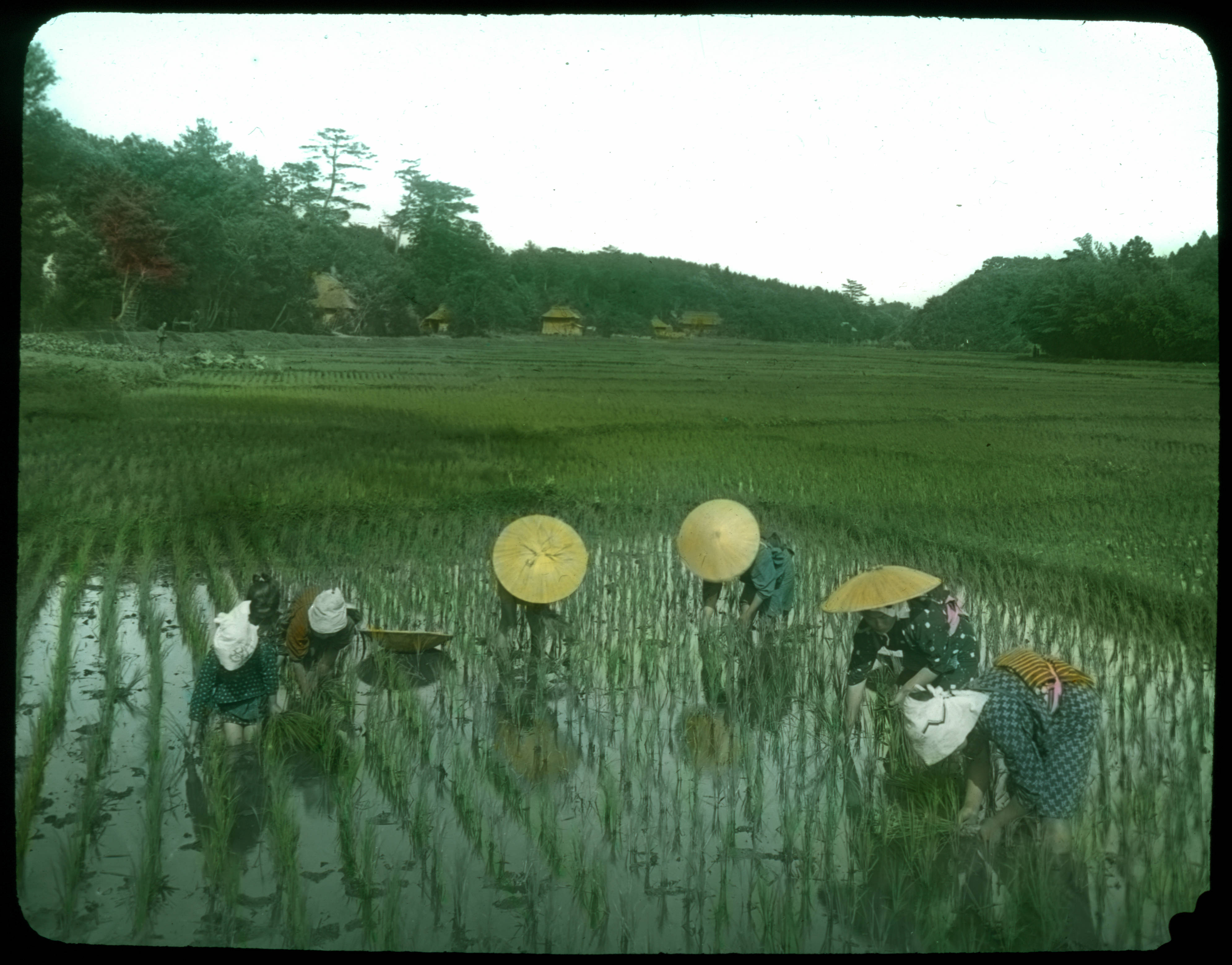
Women planting rice

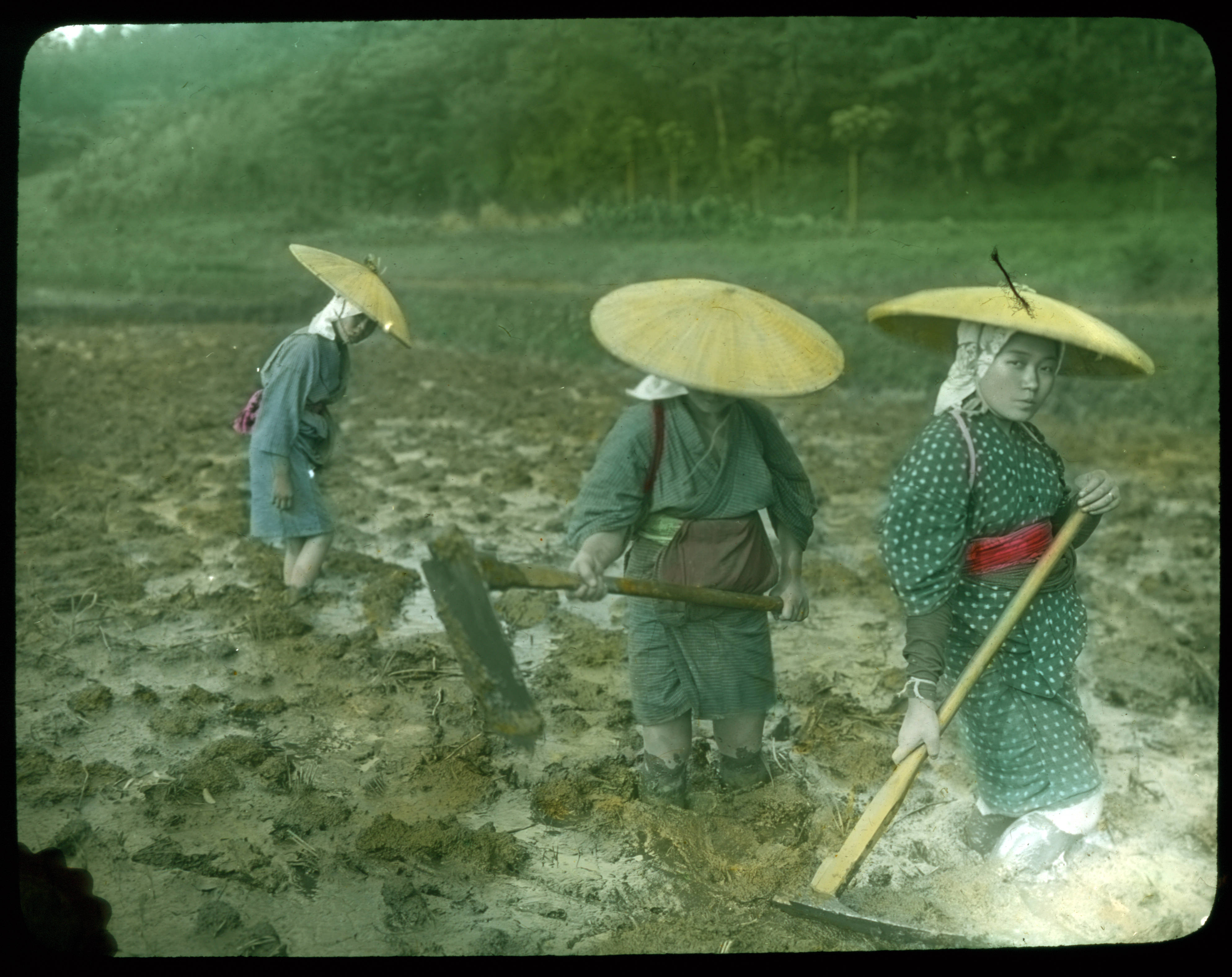
Women preparing rice field in mud

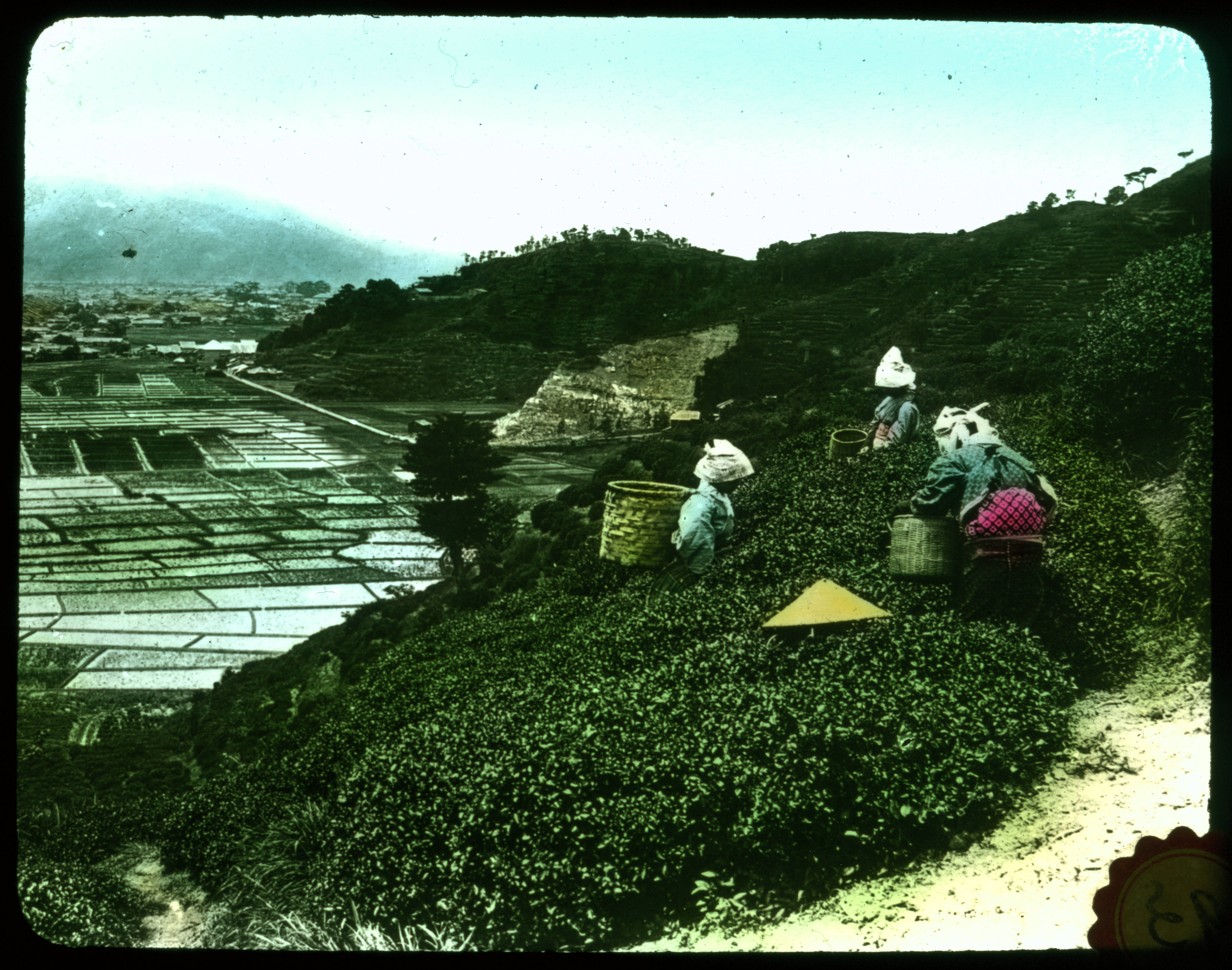
Women working on hillside; rice fields and village below
